= Maria Wanda Jastrzębska =

Polish electronics engineer and university teacher

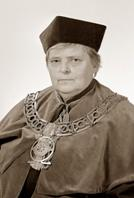
- Born: October 18, 1924; Sambir, now Ukraine
- Died: June 6, 1988 (aged 63)
- Education: Silesian University of Technology
- Occupations: Electrical engineer, academic

Maria Wanda Jastrzębska (18 October 1924 – 6 June 1988) was a Polish electronics engineer, and university teacher at Silesian University of Technology and Opole University of Technology.

== Early life ==
Maria Wanda Jastrzębska was born on 18 October 1924 in Sambir, in the Lviv region, into a family of teachers. Her father Józef was headmaster of the junior high school and her mother Jadwiga was a teacher. She had an older brother, Stanisław, who died in guerrilla fighting, and a younger sister, Jadwiga. Jastrzębska spent her early childhood in Sambor, where she attended primary school and 3 year at a Gymnasium (a secondary school with a strong emphasis on academic learning).

After the outbreak of World War II and the invasion of Poland by the Soviet army on 17 September 1939, she was sent with her family to Kazakhstan in 1940. There she worked in a sovkhoz, a Soviet state-owned farm. In 1944 she was resettled to Odessa in Ukraine and worked on a kolkhoz, a collective farm. Her father did not survive the experience.

After the end of the war, Jastrzębska returned to her hometown Sambir. In October 1945, along with her mother and sister, she was repatriated to Gliwice. She returned to education and studied at the Liceum Przyrodniczym im. E. Plater in Sosnowiec, where in 1947 she passed her matura, the final school exams which Polish students must pass to move on to higher education.

== Education and early career ==
In 1947 Jastrzębska became a student at the Faculty of Electrical Engineering of the Silesian University of Technology in Gliwice. She was a talented student, and in 1949 Professor Stanisław Fryzego an electrical engineering specialist, recommended her for a job as a junior assistant in the Department of Fundamentals of Electronics. In 1952 she completed her thesis Automatic Voltage Stabilisation of a DC Generator, earning a master's degree in electronics.

Jastrzębska continued to work in the same department for the next six years, gradually earning promotions up the academic teaching ladder. In 1960 she moved to the Department of Regulation Theory at the Silesian University of Technology headed by physicist and engineer, Professor. Stefan Węgrzyn. Under his supervision, she completed her PhD thesis on Voltages and currents arising when disconnecting electrical systems contain long lines the same year, earning the title of Doctor of Technical Sciences.

== Work at the University of Engineering in Opole ==
As well as her work at the Silesian University of Technology, Jastrzębska also taught at the Opole University of Technology, which developed from the SUT and became an independent university in 1966. In 1967 she took over the leadership of the Automation, Electronics and Telemechanics Team. She managed it until 1987.

Jastrzębska published a textbook on transmission automation, and wrote several scientific textbooks. She was fluent in French which enabled her to translate textbooks for the benefit of her students. She supervised many engineering Master's theses and PhDs. She promoted the continued professional development of staff and colleagues by regularly organising scientific seminars. She set up the Computing Machines Group, later the University Computing Centre.

Jastrzębska was appointed as an assistant professor in 1968. From September of that year to January 31, 1970, she served as Deputy Dean, and then from 1 February 1, 1970 to 31 August 1971, she was the Dean of the Faculty of Electrical Engineering at the WSI in Opole. She started and managed the creation of experimental laboratories in the field of automation, electronics and telemechanics.

She chaired the Faculty Committee for the Selection of Candidates for Studies, chaired the Senate Library Commission and the Commission on Employment of Graduates and for many years was a member of the Senate of the Technical University in Opole. As part of this role, in 1985 Jastrzębska developed a statute laying out the options for the establishment of a partially independent university.

== Work outside the university ==
As well as her scientific and teaching work at WSI, Jastrzębska was also a consultant at the Office of Projects and Municipal Economy in Opole, as well as member of the Polish Federation of Engineering Associations.

Jastrzębska became terminally ill in 1987 and lived for some time in Pińczów, with her younger sister, Jadwiga. Maria Wanda Jastrzębska died in Pińczów on 6 June 1988. She was buried next to her mother, and brother and father, who had a symbolic grave there.

== Prizes and awards ==
- Nagroda Ministra Nauki i Szkolnictwa Wyższego (National Ministry of Science and Higher Education Prize) (1969)
- Złoty Krzyż Zasługi ( Cross of Merit) (1974)
- Odznaka Zasłużony Opolszczyźnie (Badge of Merit in the Opole region) (1977)
- Odznaka Za Zasługi dla Miasta Opola (Badge of Merit for the City of Opole) (1980)
- Medal Komisji Edukacji Narodowej (Medal of the National Education Committee) (1982)
