= Jan Bart =

American cantor, Yiddish entertainer and advocate (1919–1971)

Jan Bart (January 26, 1919 – August 12, 1971) was a Jewish American cantor and Yiddish entertainer. His work combined the sounds of European Jewry and American musical tastes.

== Early life ==
Bart was born Avram Sholom (Sol) Strauser in Sambor, Poland (now Sambir, Ukraine). His family owned a bakery and, as a child, he would stand on a stool and sing to the customers. He became a cantor by the age of 11 and continued singing at religious services at various synagogues in the Greater New York area by the time his family immigrated to the US in 1930.

== Career ==
At age 16, Bart aspired to become a contestant on the renowned Major Bowes Amateur Hour radio show, a program broadcast in the United States during the 1930s and 1940s. Although he was never scheduled to be on the show, he and his high school friend Sid Bernstein went to the show's office, found a piano, and performed an aria from Pagliacci. Major Bowes walked in and was so taken with his voice that he completely changed the following Sunday's scheduled program to put him on. He won the contest and had the opportunity to travel around the country with the Major Bowes’ touring group, thereby supporting his family during the Depression. From there he went on to appear in nightclubs, cabarets, and theaters throughout the United States, including the Copacabana in Miami Beach, the Latin Quarter in New York, the Last Frontier in Las Vegas, and New York's Palace Theater.

Having been rejected from the Army for medical reasons, he contributed to the war effort by selling war bonds and singing for the troops.

Bart recorded for RCA and Columbia record labels. He recorded "We’re in Love, We’re in Love" with the Ray Charles Chorus, and later under his own label, Janson Records. He was a member of ASCAP (The American Society of Composers, Authors And Publishers) starting with his own composition, "Ecstasy" that he penned at age 20.

Through the 1940s and 50s he was a regular on Yiddish radio shows, including the American-Jewish Hour, Yiddish Melodies in Swing and The American-Jewish Caravan of Stars on WHN and WMGM radio, along with the likes of the Barry Sisters, Molly Picon and Mickey Katz, with composer Abe Ellstein at the baton. His "Jan Bart Show" on WEVD radio in New York ran for 18 years and his "Jan Bart Show” on WATV-TV for six. His many television appearances included the Milton Berle Show and the National Muscular Dystrophy Telethon with Jerry Lewis. He starred in the Yiddish film "Catskill Honeymoon" in 1950.

When Israel became a state in 1948, Bart gave up his nightclub career to devote his whole life to establishing and preserving the State of Israel by working for Israel bonds throughout the United States, Canada, Europe, and Australia. In the early days, selling Israel bonds meant riding along the boardwalk in the back of an open station wagon, pleading into a megaphone the lessons of the war, that the existence of the State of Israel was central to the survival of the Jewish people.

In the early 1950s, while appearing in Miami Beach, he was asked to sing at the first organized Israel Bond meeting. As gifted as he was a singer, he was an even better fundraiser, melding stories with his songs. His humor portrayed the new experiences of Jewish émigrés and stories from the mamaloshen. As Israel bond rallies developed into more organized, pre-sold events, he always doubled and tripled the expected return. By his death at age 52 in 1971, he had raised more money for Israel Bonds than any other entertainer, having appeared at more than 2,200 performances over 20 years.

Throughout his life he continued to use his cantorial skills, conducting High Holiday services at the Riverside Plaza Hotel each fall and returning to the "Borscht Belt" (the Catskill Mountains of New York), where he, like many Jewish entertainers, had gotten his start, to conduct Passover services at Green's, Brown's, Young's Gap, and the Windsor hotels.

Through the 1950s and 60s he made several recording albums, including Yinglish, old Yiddish melodies sung in English, and Fiddler on the Roof in Yiddish, for which he wrote the Yiddish lyrics. He published his biography with Barney Rubin, I Lost a Thousand Pounds (Oceanic Publications).

He was a popular entertainer at weddings and bar mitzvahs. He wrote individual anniversary songs for each occasion and sang "When did she get to be a beauty?" for every wedding and "When did he grow to be so tall?" for every bar mitzvah.

== Stamp collector ==
Bart was a renowned Israeli and Judaica stamp collector and authority, writing several columns and articles for stamp newspapers and journals and judging international stamp competitions. He was the founder of the Judaica Historical Philatelic Society, which was created out of his own meticulous collection of Jews on Stamps.

== Personal life ==
In 1941 Bart married singer Lillian Robbins, an operatic contralto, who performed as a soloist at Radio City Music Hall. Their daughter Judy Bart Kancigor (1943- ) is a food writer, author of Cooking Jewish (Workman Publications). Their son Gary Bart (1946- ) is the founder of Weight Watchers of Orange County and produced the films "In the Name of the People" and "Invincible". Lillian died in 2010 at age 93.

== Death ==
Bart died at age 52 in 1971 from complications of diabetes. He is interred at Mt. Ararat Cemetery in Farmingdale, NY.
