= Church of the Nativity of the Theotokos, Sambir =

Ukrainian Greek Catholic church in Ukraine

Church of the Nativity of the Theotokos
- Ukrainian: Церква Різдва Пресвятої Богородиці
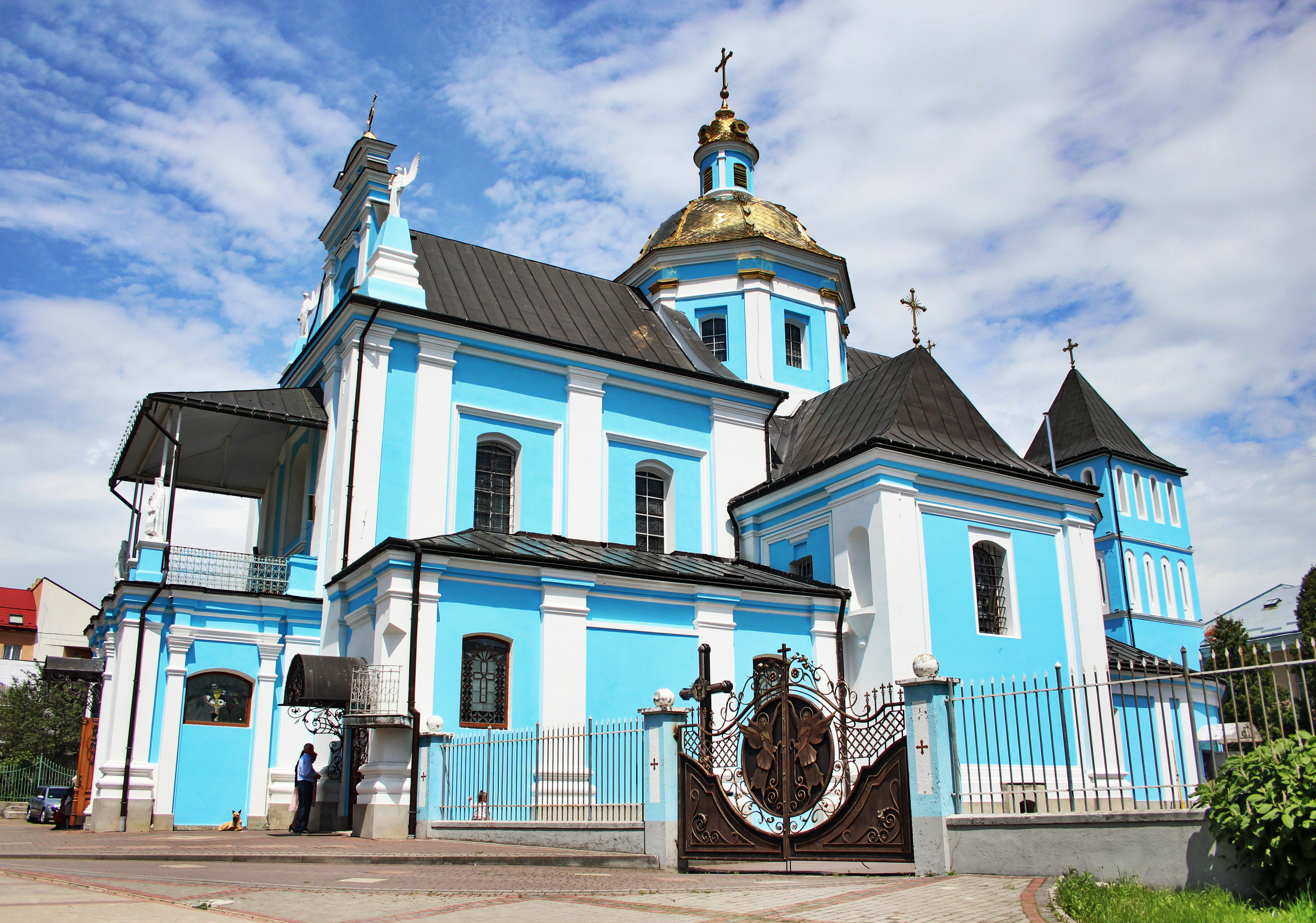
- Sambir. Church of Nativity of the Theotokos
- Church of the Nativity of the Theotokos
- 49°30′59.33″N 23°11′49.40″E
- Location: Sambir
- Country: Ukraine
- Denomination: Catholic Church
- Sui iuris church: Ukrainian Greek Catholic Church

History
- Former name: Church of Nativity of the Theotokos
- Status: acting
- Founded: c. 1570; 456 years ago
- Founder(s): Bona Sforza, townspeoples

The Church of the Nativity of the Theotokos is a historic Greek Catholic church in Sambir, in the Lviv region of Ukraine.

== History ==
The church was originally built from wood in the late 1570s, in the town of Sambir, (in the Polish–Lithuanian Commonwealth). It was commissioned by the Ruthenian (Polish: rusini), Queen of Poland and Grand Duchess of Lithuania Bona.
This decision provoked protests and complaints in the multi-confessional environment of the community of Sambir. However, the "dispute was successfully resolved in favor of the Lord" and the wooden Church of Nativity of the Theotokos was built, and served until 1738, when it was rebuilt in stone.

The stone church, preserved with minor rearrangements and side-chapels, was built in 1738. Funds for its construction and design were donated by the Komarnickis, a wealthy family of Galician nobles.

The architectural lines of the building have a simple and clear form. On the facade, a balcony and loft, house statues of guardian angels. Inside, there is a painting by the artist-painter Yablonski.

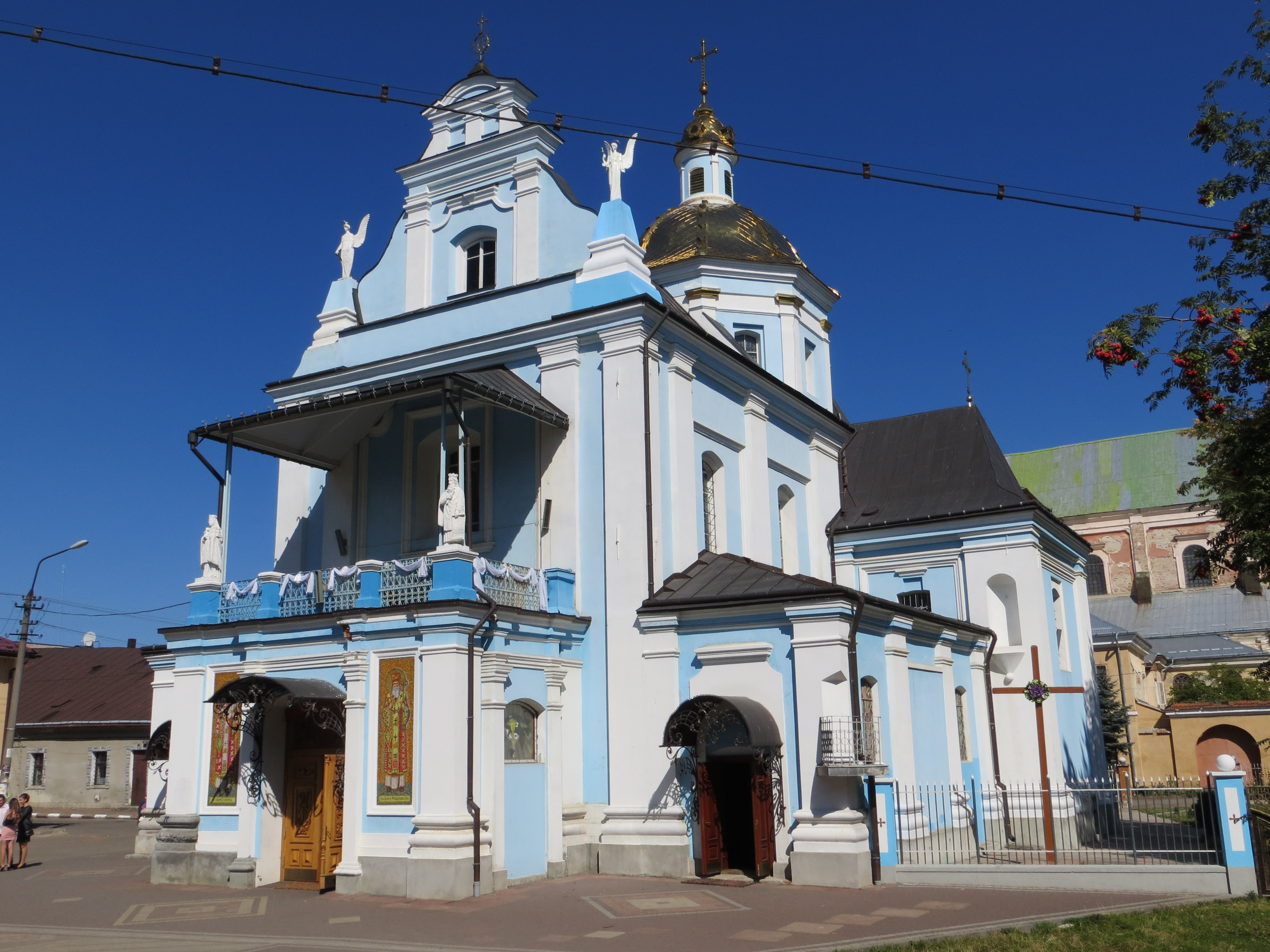
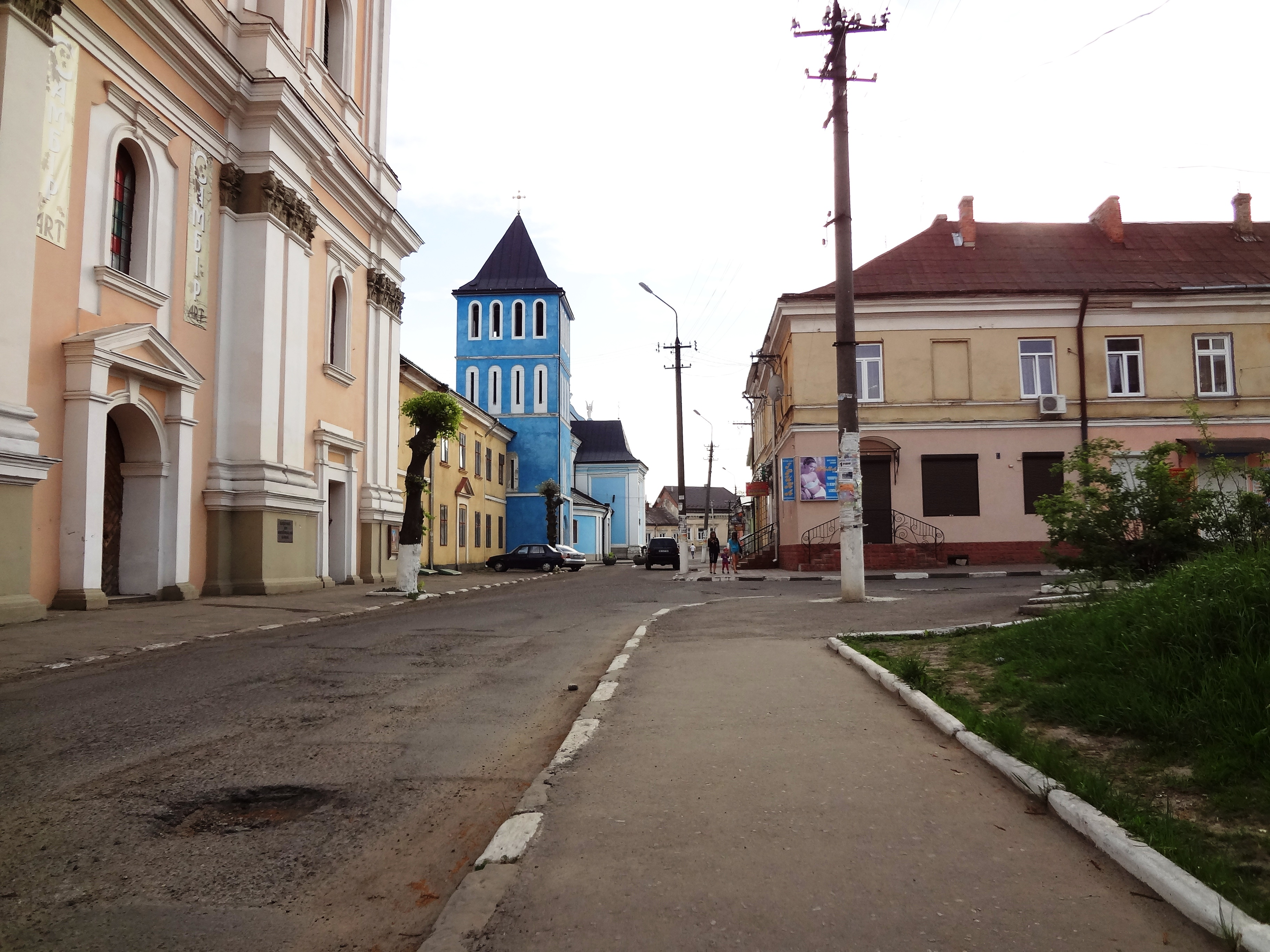
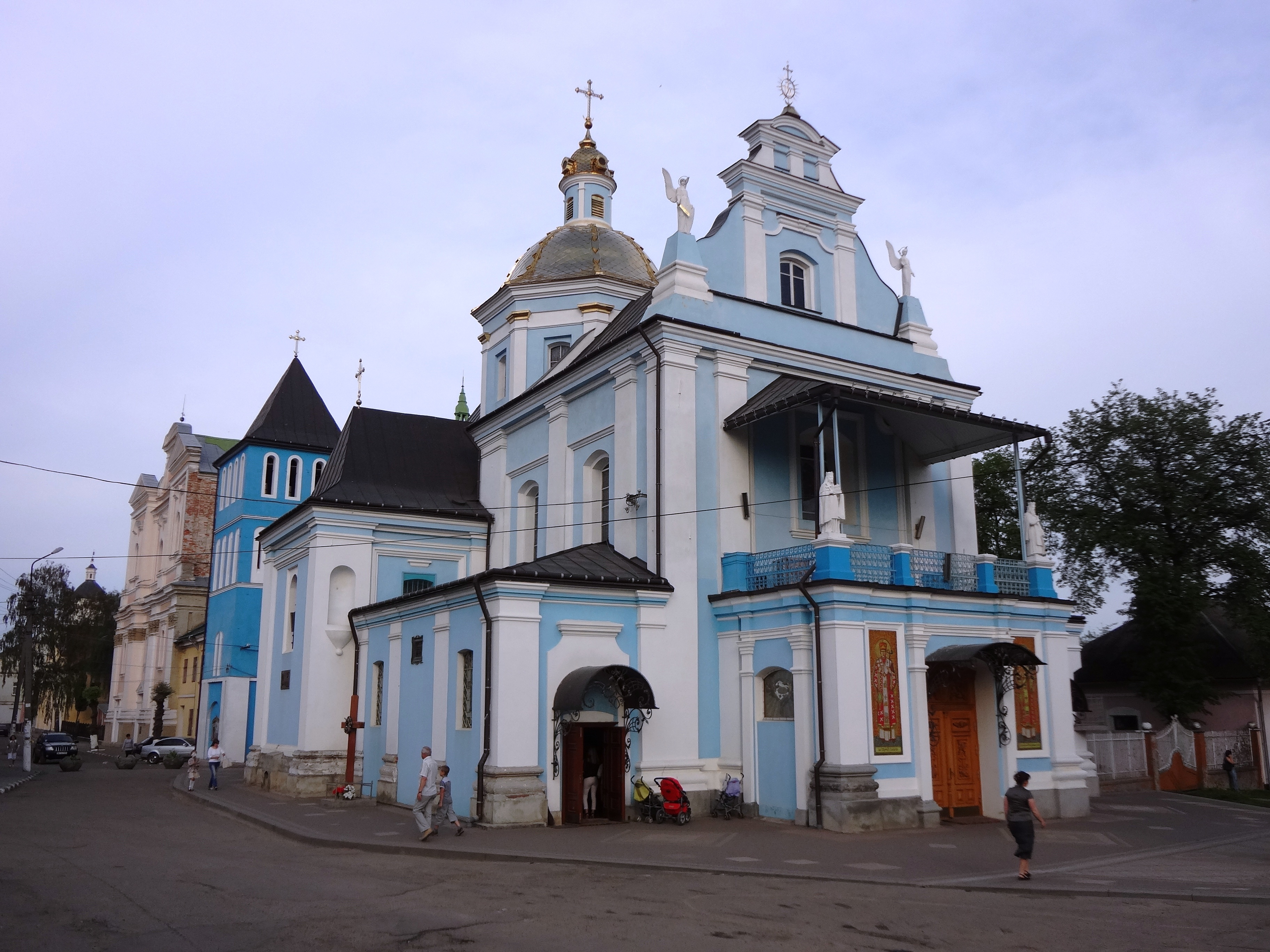
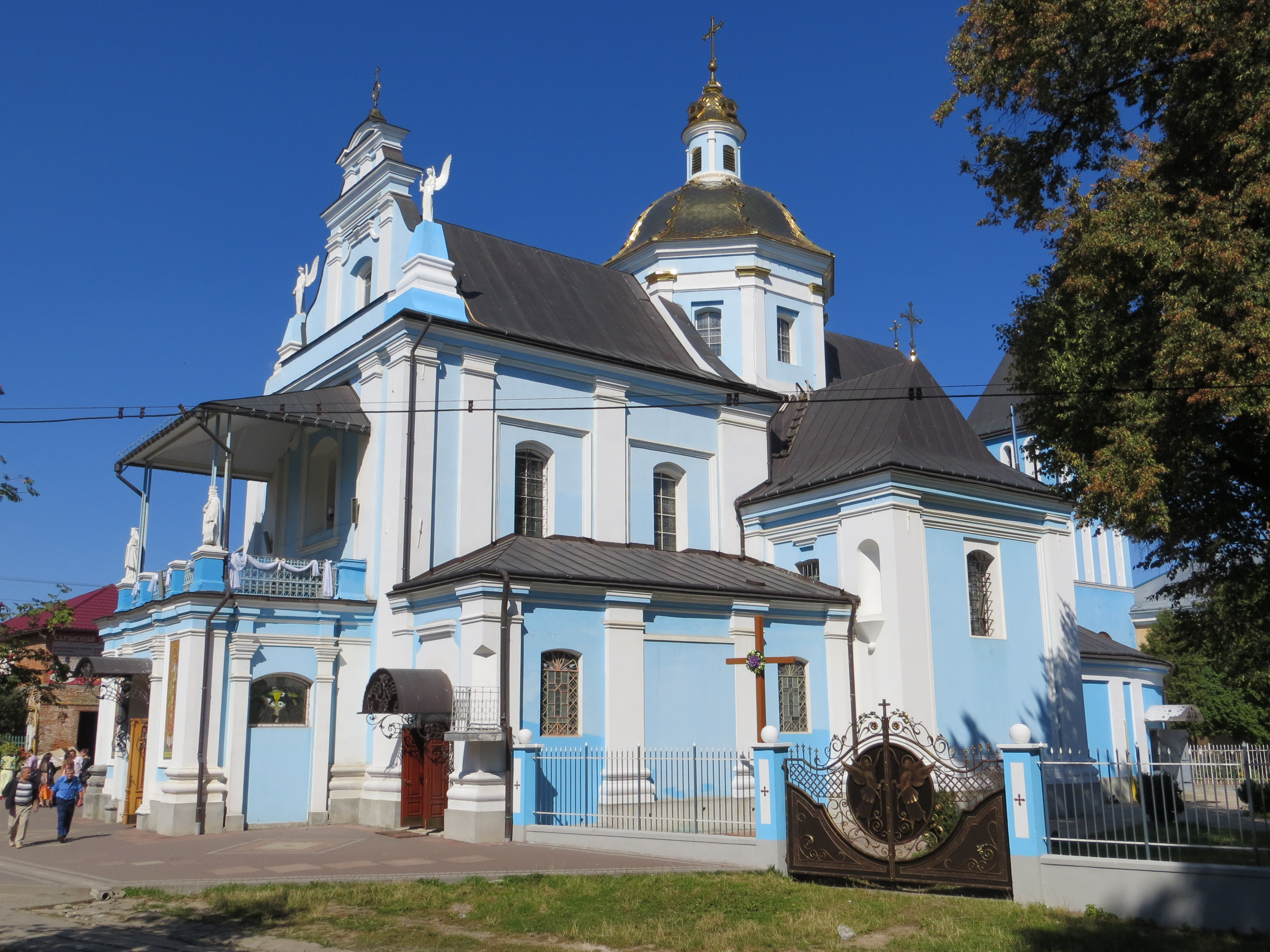
Sambir. Church of Nativity of the Theotokos

== See also ==
- Samborsky miraculous icon of the Theotokos(in Ukrainian)
- Performance in the Church of the Theotokos until the day of St. Nicholas on YouTube
