= Sambir =

City in Lviv Oblast, Ukraine

Sambir Самбiр
- City
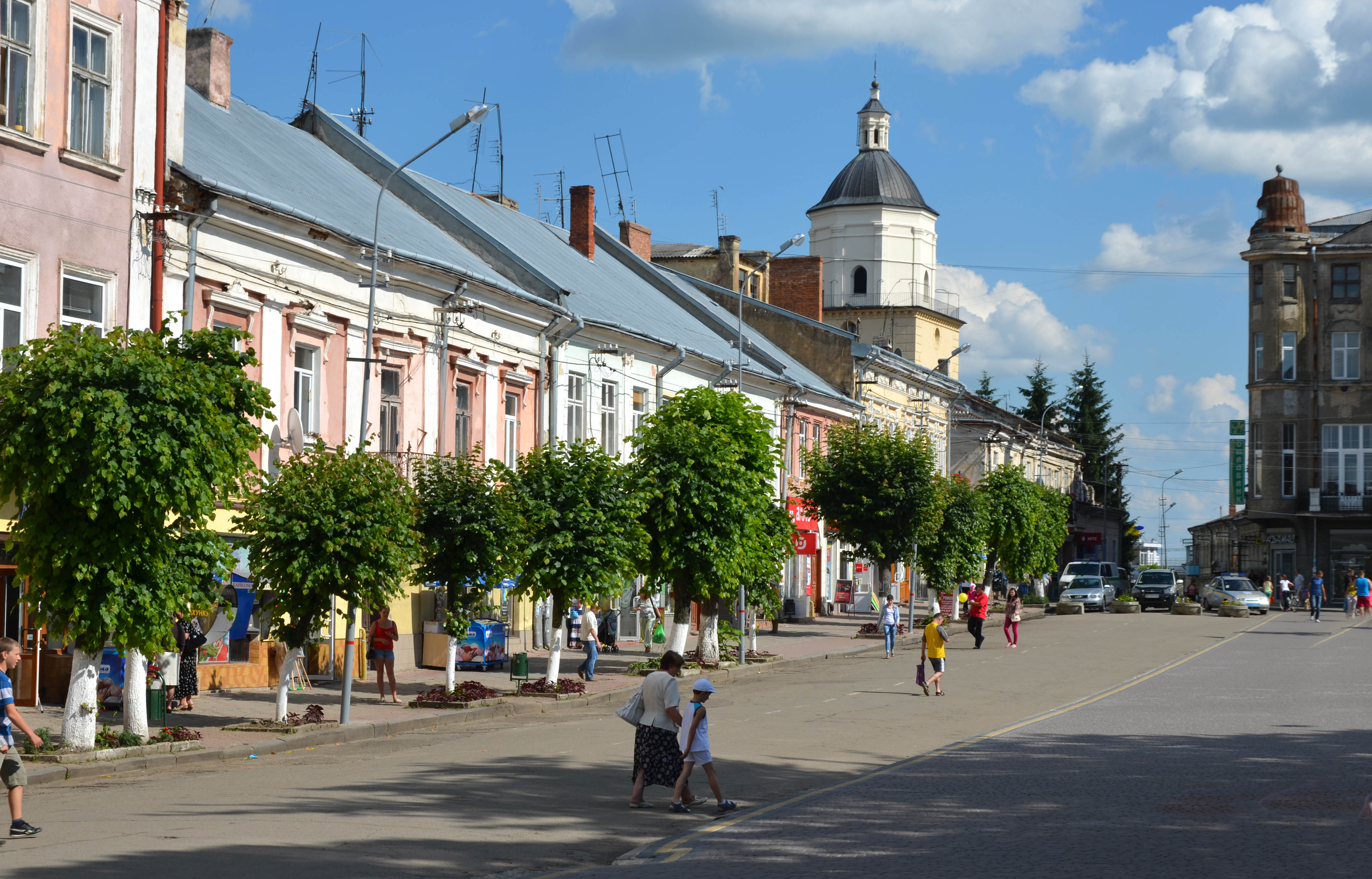
- Market Square

- Flag Coat of arms
- Interactive map of Sambir
- Location of Sambir Sambir (Ukraine)
- Coordinates: 49°31′0″N 23°12′10″E
- Country: Ukraine
- Oblast: Lviv Oblast
- Raion: Sambir Raion
- Hromada: Sambir urban hromada

Government
  - Mayor: Zinoviy Rivniak
- Elevation: 260 m (850 ft)

Population (2025)
  - Total: 35,186
- Time zone: UTC+2 (+2 GMT)
  - Summer (DST): UTC+3
- Postal code: 81400
- Area code: +380-3236
- Website: sambircity.gov.ua

Sambir (Ukrainian: Самбір, IPA: [ˈsɑmbir]; Polish: Sambor, IPA: ['sam.bɔr]; Yiddish: סאַמבאָר, romanized: Sambor) is a city in Sambir Raion, Lviv Oblast, Ukraine. It serves as the administrative center of Sambir Raion (district) and is located close to the border with Poland. Sambir hosts the administration of Sambir urban hromada, one of the hromadas of Ukraine. Its population is 34,152 (2022 estimate)or 35,186 (2025 estimate).

== Geography ==
=== Location ===
Sambir is situated on the left bank of the Dniester river. The city stands at a crossroads. It is a cultural, industrial and tourist center of modern Ukraine.

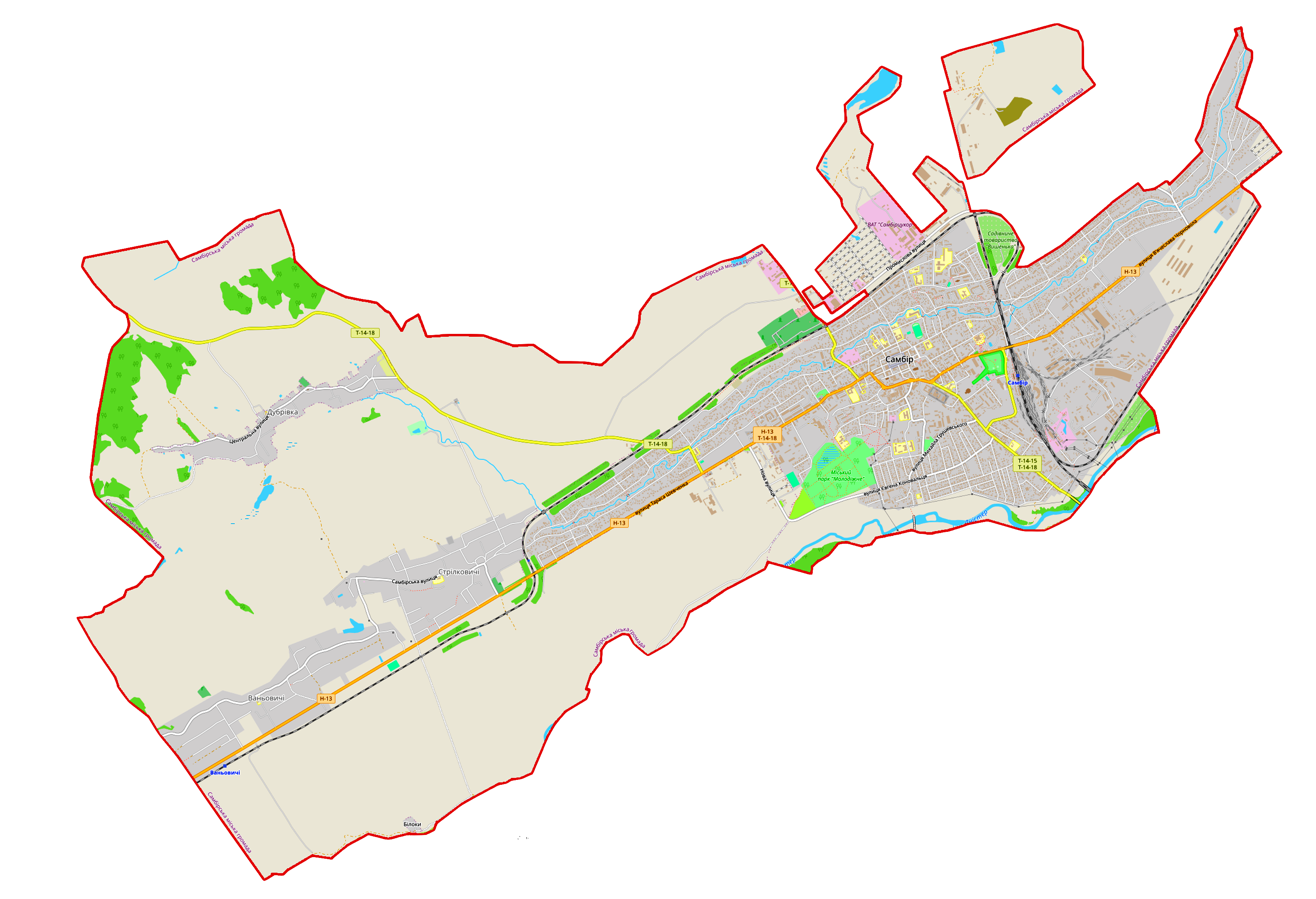
A map of Sambir urban hromada

Sambir is the fifth largest city in Lviv Oblast. Distance to the regional center by rail is 78 miles, by road 76 km length of the city from the south-west to north-east is 10.5 km, and from north-west to south-east 4.5 km. The total area is 24 km^{2}.
The center is located at the height of 305,96 m above sea level.

The city is located on an important road connecting Eastern and Western Europe. Through Sambir run electrified railway tracks, trunk pipelines and power lines.

=== Climate ===
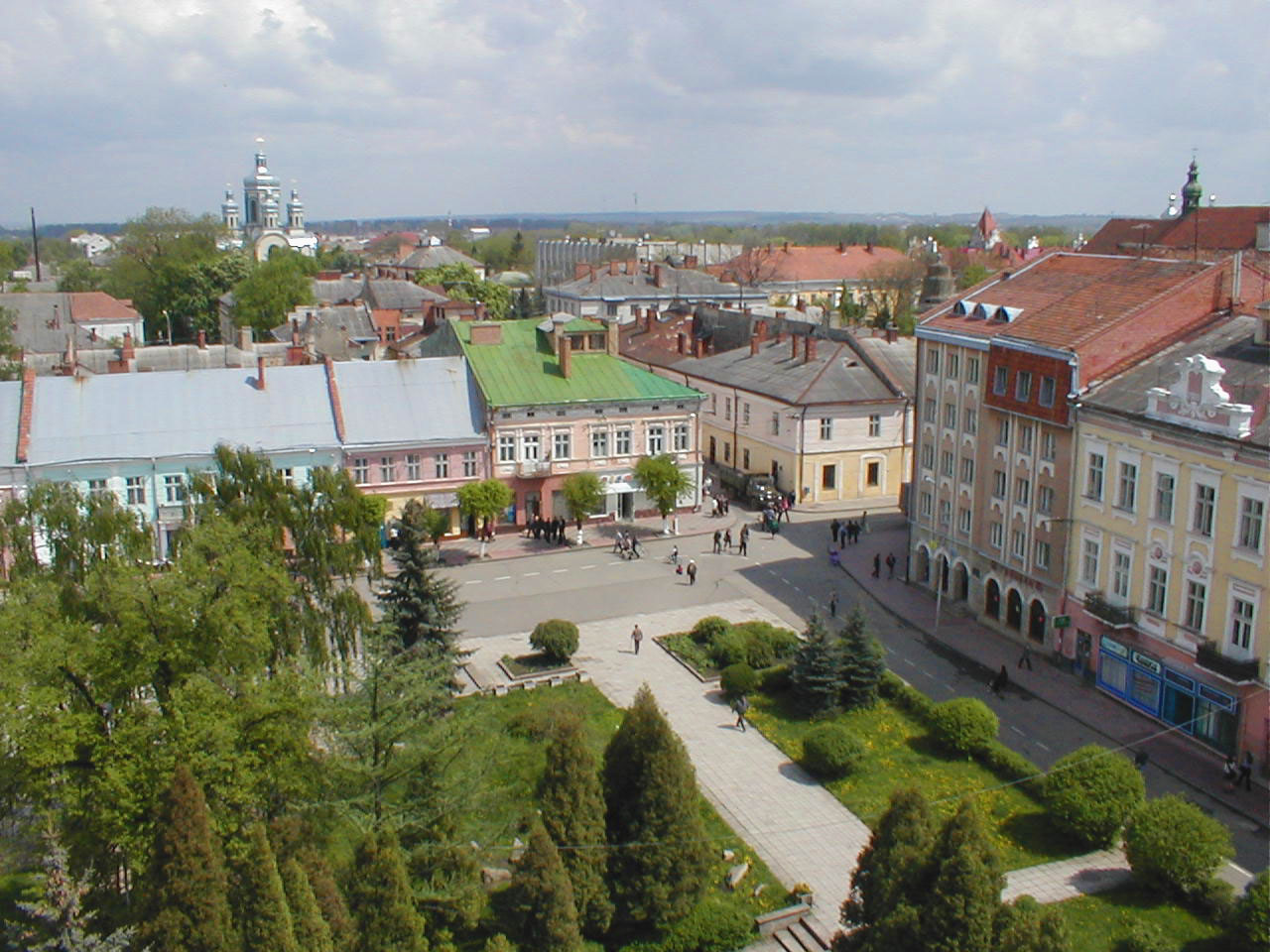
A view of Sambir in spring

The average annual temperature in Sambir is between 8 and 10 °C (46 and 50 °F). There is a fairly mild winter, with thaws, sometimes without snow cover (for winter precipitation typical minimum amount per year, although they are in the form of rain and snow falls often), in Sambir. Spring is long, sometimes lengthy, windy, cool, and very wet. Summer is warm, hot, a little wet and a little rainy. Autumn is warm, sunny and dry (usually lasts until the first of November). The average temperature of the coldest month (January ) is −4 °C (25 °F), the average temperature in July 28 °C (82 °F). The winter 2013-2014 was extremely warm. The average temperature in December stood at 1 °C (34 °F), minimum −7 °C (19 °F), and maximum 9 °C (48 °F). Also, the snow cover at all this month was observed.

== History ==
=== Early history ===
The history of the cities Sambir and Staryi Sambir, which are both situated in Halychyna (which is part of Ukraine), in Lviv Oblast by the Dnister river, begins in a place currently known as Staryi Sambir ("Old Sambir"). This was founded in the 12th century and served as an important center of the Halych Princedom of Kyivan Rus' (Ruthenia). In the 13th century, in the year 1241 the Tatars destroyed it, by burning it down to the ground.

Part of the Stariy Sambir population, especially the weavers, moved to a village called Pohonich, at a distance of some twelve kilometers from the old town, and it was called Novyi Sambir (New Sambor) to distinguish it from old Sambor. The latter began to be called Staryi Sambir, or the old city. The village of Pohonycz was first under the rule of Rus, from 1124 Principality of Halych (or Principality of Halychian Rus'). The city of Sambir from 1254 was part of Kingdom of Galicia–Volhynia, (or Kingdom of Rus’ (lat. Regnum Russiæ / Rusie)) and was mentioned in Galician–Volhynian Chronicle. Upon the death of the last ruler of the Kingdom of Rus’ Yuri II Boleslav in 1349 became part of the Kingdom of Poland and later on part of Ruthenian Voivodeship, also called Rus’ Voivodeship (Latin: Palatinatus russiae, Polish: Województwo ruskie, Ukrainian: Руське воєводство, romanized: Ruske voievodstvo).

=== Beginning of Polish rule ===
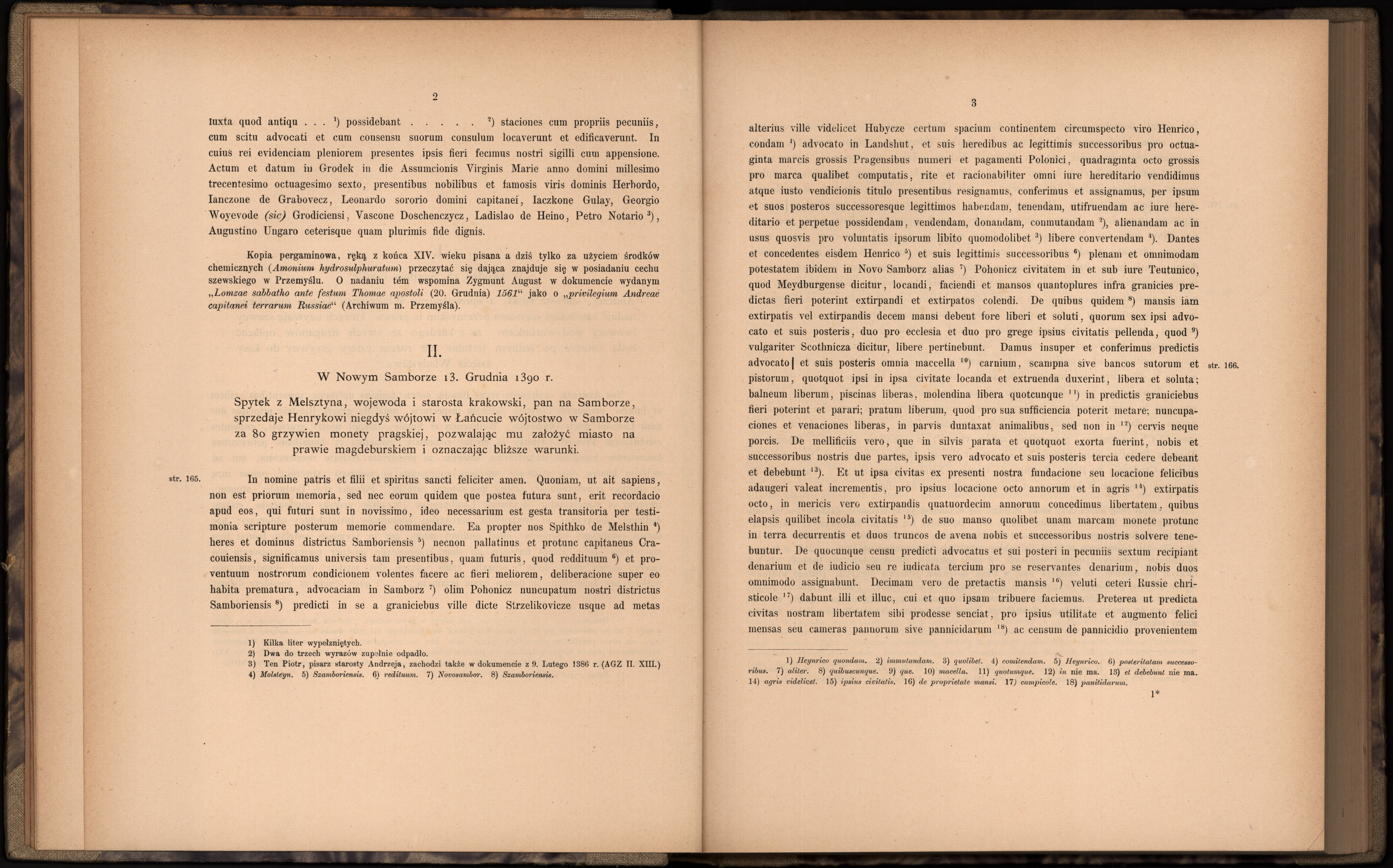
The text of a charter issued by Spytek (Spytko) of Melsztyn in 1390

The foundations of the future city of Sambir were laid in 1390 by the voivode of Kraków, Spytek of Melsztyn, a companion and adviser to the Polish king Władysław II Jagiełło (1396–1434) in his war expeditions. The king granted his loyal companion, for his military services, enormous pieces of land, from Dobromyl to Stryi. Spytek (also Spytko), evaluating the importance of Pohonicz, left a document dated 13 December 1390 addressed to the Wojt (Mukhtar), Henrik from Landshut, permitting him to establish a city in Pohonicz to be called Novyi Sambor, granting it the rights of Magdeburg.

It is not possible to determine exactly when the village of Pohonicz was founded because of the lack of historical sources. It may be assumed that, it being on the important commercial and strategic crossroads near the Dniester and its tributary Mlinuvka, it served as a worth center for fortification and defense. Despite the fact that the village of Pohonicz was raised to the status of a city and its name changed to Novi-Sambor, we find in official documents up to the year 1450 that the city was called by two names: Sambor or Novyi Sambor, formerly Pohonicz.

Sambir is situated on what is almost an island formed between two parallel rivers, the one distant from the other by a few kilometers – the Dniester on one side and the Strviazh on the other – which come together after Sambir in the vicinity of Dolubova. In the pre-historic period the Dniester, at a distance of about three kilometers from Sambor, created a special kind of tributary called Mlinuvka, which, separating completely from the Dniester, falls into the Strwiaz. The Dniester and the Mlinuvka add a natural charm to Sambor. The grant of municipal rights led to people flocking to the city – Poles, Ruthenians, Germans and Jews.

From the city's founding, Spytko saw to its development and granted it many rights. In January 1394, King Wladyslaw Jagiello, at Spytko's request, exempted the inhabitants from paying various taxes. Not for very long, however, did Sambor benefit from his actions for the good of the city. In 1399 Spytko participated in the war against the Tatars, in which he was killed on 12 August 1399 near the river Worskla (see: Battle of the Vorskla River). After his death, the Sambor properties passed to his wife, Elzbieta Melsztynska.

In the earliest times, Sambir had natural conditions for development of commerce, lying as it did on the important commercial route where the Baltic Sea, through the river San, and the Black Sea, through the river Dniester, are connected. The Dniester had already played an important role as a natural water route leading to Akerman near the Black Sea. From there, the Greek merchants reached the land of Scythia with their products. Through Sambor, an important dry land route also led to Hungary, and by this passage to the borders of Poland, merchandise was brought such as timber, salt, cattle, fox and bear skins, honey, and from Hungary, particularly wines. The Sambor merchants would purchase from the Hungarian merchants wines, horses, leather, cloth and various fruits.

From Sambir there was also a road to Lviv through Rudki and Komarno, which connected it with the commercial center of goods from the east, making the city an important commercial juncture.

Sambir was rebuilt several times. In 1498, when Poland was attacked by the Turks and the Tatars, it was burnt down completely. And before the population had recovered from this disaster, the city was threatened, in 1515, by an invasion by the Tatars. In the 16th century, a new Sambor was established on the ruins of the burnt-out wooden houses.

The royal palace, which was situated outside the city walls in the suburb of Blich, was the second most important element of the city's defence. At first it was built of wood and was burnt down in 1498. When the Starosta Shidlovski rebuilt it in 1530, near the Dniester, he built it as a fortress, surrounded by moats, behind which were earthen walls.

In the royal palace, which was the seat of the Starosta, there was, besides the service workers numbering sixty-five in 1569, a garrison composed of infantry and cavalry. This army was intended not only to protect the palace, but also to safeguard the peace and security of Sambor and the vicinity. Furthermore, it was needed to stamp out gangs which would infiltrate from Hungary and spread panic in the neighborhood.

The royal palace of Sambor had the honor to host within it almost all the kings of Poland and heads of state; many receptions were held there with the participation of the city's notables.

=== Early modern period ===
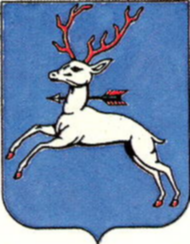
Historic emblem of Sambir

In 1530, in view of all the invasions and attacks on the city, the Starosta (district governor) Krzysztof Odrowaz Szydlowski surrounded it with a thick wall and deep trenches, to enable it to be defended. For two hundred and fifty years, Sambor, thus enclosed, was compelled to shrink, limiting itself to narrow streets, without any possibility of expanding and developing naturally. The city was frozen into restricting borders until the first years of the Austrian conquest in 1772.

The city's walls, gates and towers were of much concern to the city fathers, who imposed heavy taxes on the population to cover the costs of safeguarding them for defense. Furthermore, each of the eleven artisans' guilds in the city had to take upon itself the obligation to guard and defend a certain part of the wall, as well as provide arms at its own expense.

In the center of the market place stood Ratusz (City Hall), with a clock tower on it. This building, the most important in the rebuilt city, was entirely destroyed in 1637 in a fire that wiped out almost all of Sambor. The new Ratusz was completed only in 1668, and then, for the first time, at the top of the tower the city emblem was unfurled: a deer with an arrow in its throat.

In the mid-18th century, 68% of the town's population was Roman Catholic, 25% was Jewish, and 6% was Greek Catholic.

=== Under Austrian rule ===
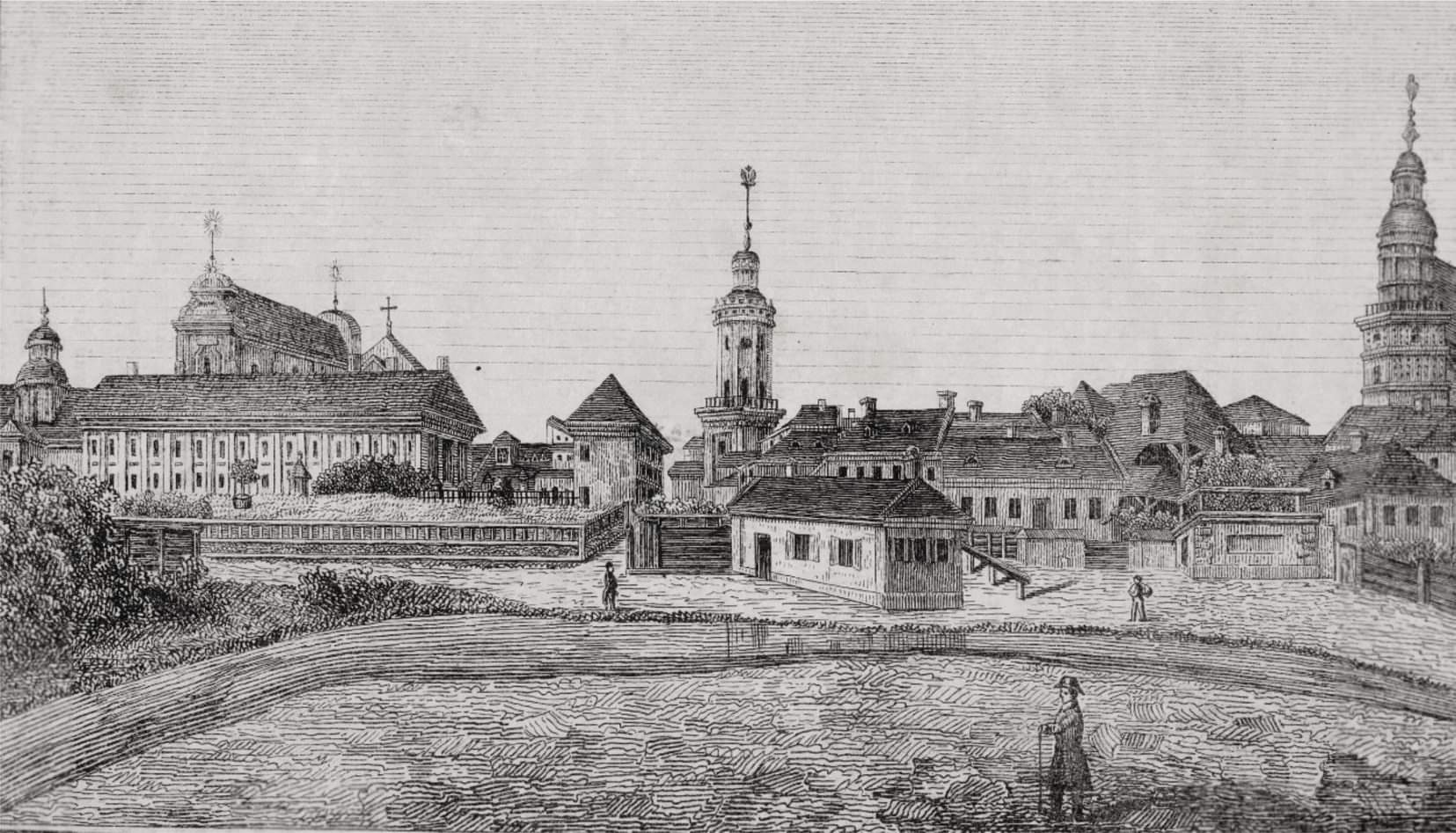
Sambir on an engraving from 1844

After the First Partition of Poland in 1772 Sambir along with the rest of Galicia, became part of the Habsburg Monarchy. Starting from 1780, the new authorities initiated secularization of church property, including all of the city's Roman Catholic monasteries, whose buildings were used as military depots, prisons, offices and schools. In 1784 the dismantlement of city walls began on the order of Austrian administration. During the same period two nearby ponds were filled up. In 1795 a great fire destroyed the old Market Square with its wooden and timber framed architecture. In the following years Sambir was rebuilt in a predominantly Classicist style. As cemeteries located near churches and monasteries were liquidated, a new Christian burial ground was established in one of the suburbs. During the early 19th century a new cemetery also appeared in the Jewish quarter.

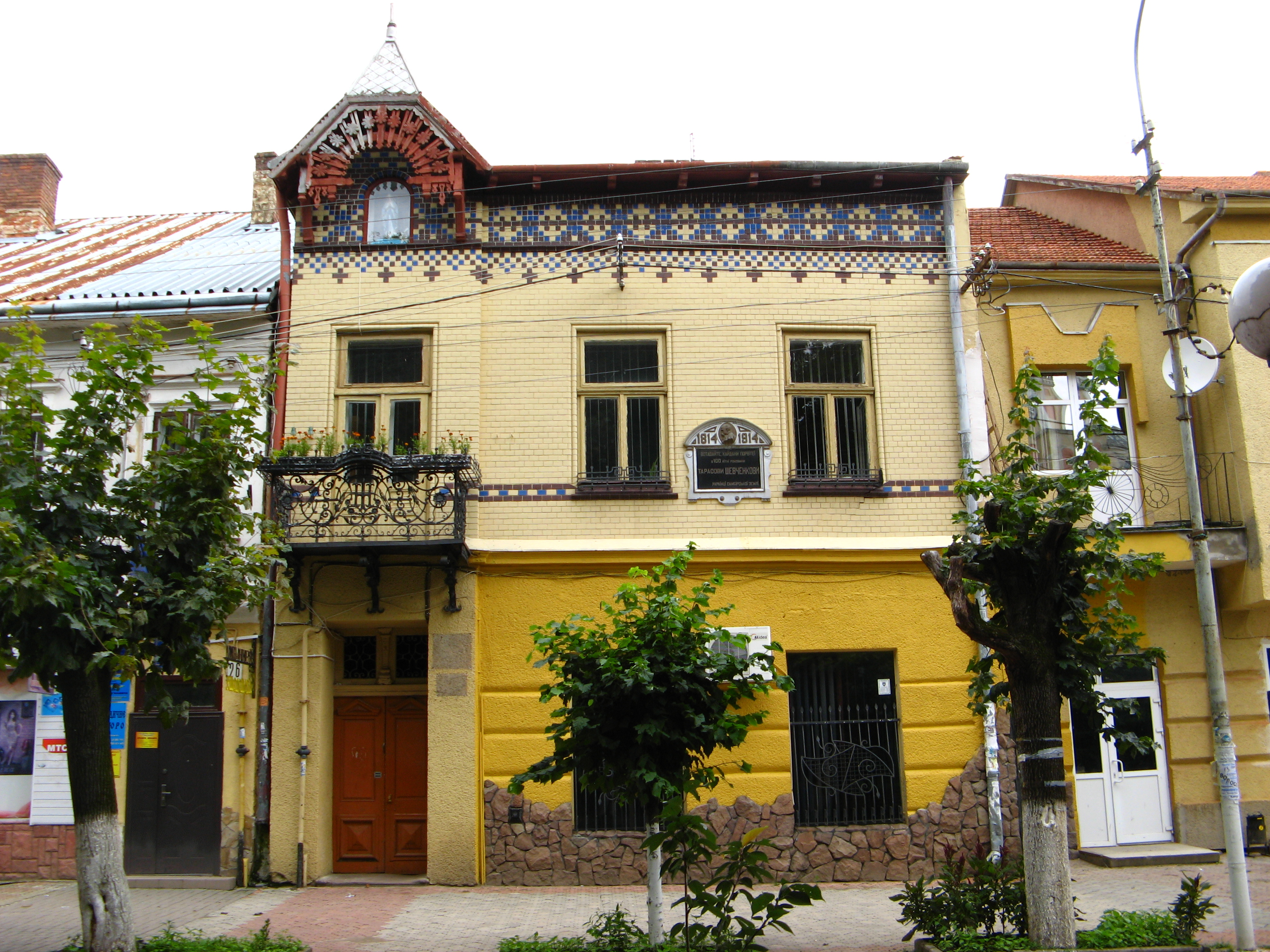
House of Narodna Torhivlia

Following the introduction of local self-government in the Austrian Empire in 1870, Sambir experienced a construction boom. New building regulations were adopted, and a number of new streets emerged. The trading area in the Market Square was moved in order to be replaced with a garden square. The period of the late 19th and early 20th century in Sambir is characterized with many buildings in Historicist and Renaissance Revival, Romanesque revival, Art Nouveau and other styles. Among the most notable structures from that era were the railway station (ruined by German troops in 1939) and the local court (see below). In 1907-1909 a power plant was established in the city. In 1887 Narodna Torhivlia, a Ukrainian cooperative organization, was founded in Sambir. Its office, constructed in the early 20th century by Ivan Levynskyi's bureau, represents the national Ukrainian style of the time. Many luxurious villas were constructed by richer inhabitants during that period.

=== 20th century ===
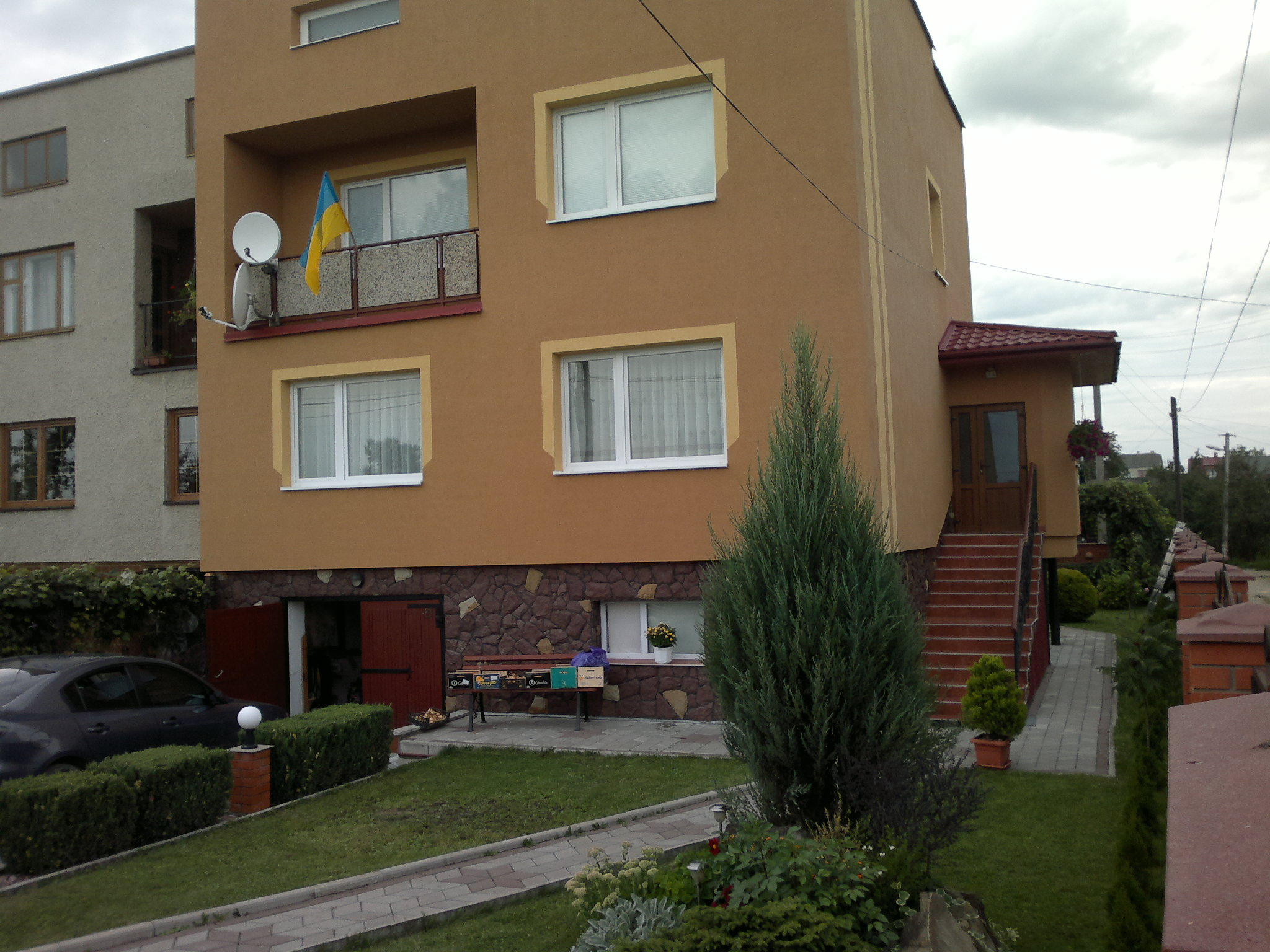
Residential housing in Sambir

Unlike many other cities in Galicia, Sambir evaded serious destruction during World War I. Following the establishment of Polish rule in the aftermath of the conflict, most of the city's development was financed with private efforts. During that period private schools were established by the Ukrainian, Polish and Jewish communities. Manor buildings in the styles of Art Deco, Zakopane Style and Hutsul Secession still remain a monument from that time.

During World War II several buildings in Sambir were destroyed. Under Soviet rule the city expanded with the construction of new residential quarters built according to typical projects. An industrial area formed in the northern part of the city. An urban park with a beach was established in the Dnister valley during the late 1950s. Due to the destruction of several historical localities, the city increasingly lost its distinct features.

=== Independent Ukraine ===
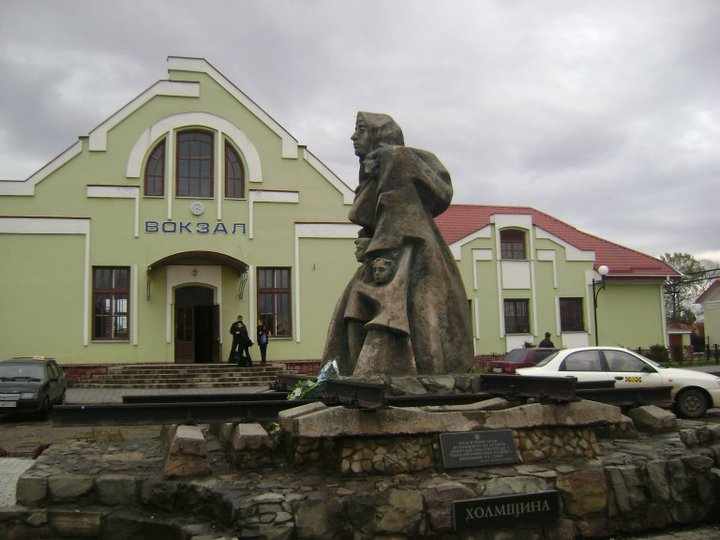
Sambir railway station with the monument to deported Ukrainians

Following Ukraine's independence, numerous streets and squares in Sambir were renamed and decorated with monuments of prominent Ukrainians such as Taras Shevchenko, Andrii Chaikovskyi, Les Kurbas, as well as religious figures including Pope John Paul II and Virgin Mary. Several churches belonging to various confessions such as the Ukrainian Autocephalous Orthodox Church, Ukrainian Greek Catholic Church, Ukrainian Orthodox Church - Kyiv Patriarchate and the Evangelical Baptist Church were established. In 2004 a new railway station was opened on the site of the old one, which had been destroyed during the Second World War. A monument commemorating Ukrainians deported from Poland in 1945-1946 is located in a square in front of the railway terminal.

Until 18 July 2020, Sambir was incorporated as a city of oblast significance and served as the administrative center of Sambir Raion though it did not belong to the raion. In July 2020, as part of the administrative reform of Ukraine, which reduced the number of raions of Lviv Oblast to seven, the city of Sambir was merged into Sambir Raion.

Today the 704th Detached Regiment of Radiological, Chemical, and Biological Protection of the Ukrainian Armed Forces is located in the town.

== Jewish community ==
=== Before the Second World War ===
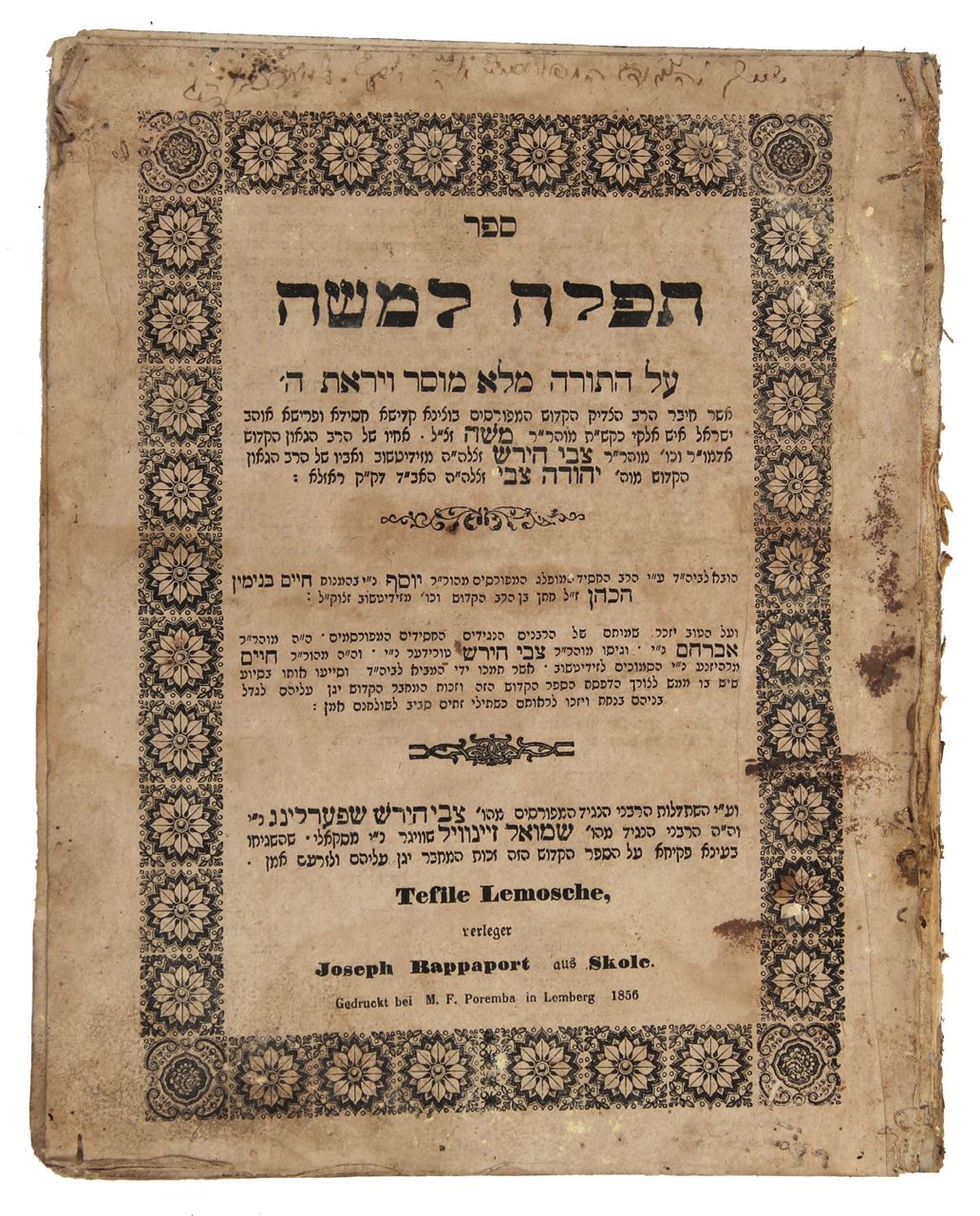
A Jewish prayer book from Sambir, 1856

During the 16th and 17th centuries, the settlement of Jews in the city was slowed down by legal restrictions. Jews resided in the area which belonged to the castle and was known as Blich or Bleich. A wooden synagogue was constructed there. The Jewish community of Sambor lived under the jurisdiction of Przemysl qahal. Relations with burghers were tense, and Jews were forbidden to enter the city by a decree of king John Casimir.

In 1735 King August III allowed Sambor's Jews to build houses in the castle area, and engage in trade and crafts. However, even in the second part of the 18th century the number of Jewish residences was limited to only 40. 513 Jews lived in the city as of 1764.

In 1895 a Jewish trading school was established in the Blich area.

There were around 8,000 Jews living in the town of Sambor in 1939, predominantly in the city-centre. There was a Jewish school and a synagogue. The Jews were merchants, craftsmen and artisans.

=== During the Holocaust ===
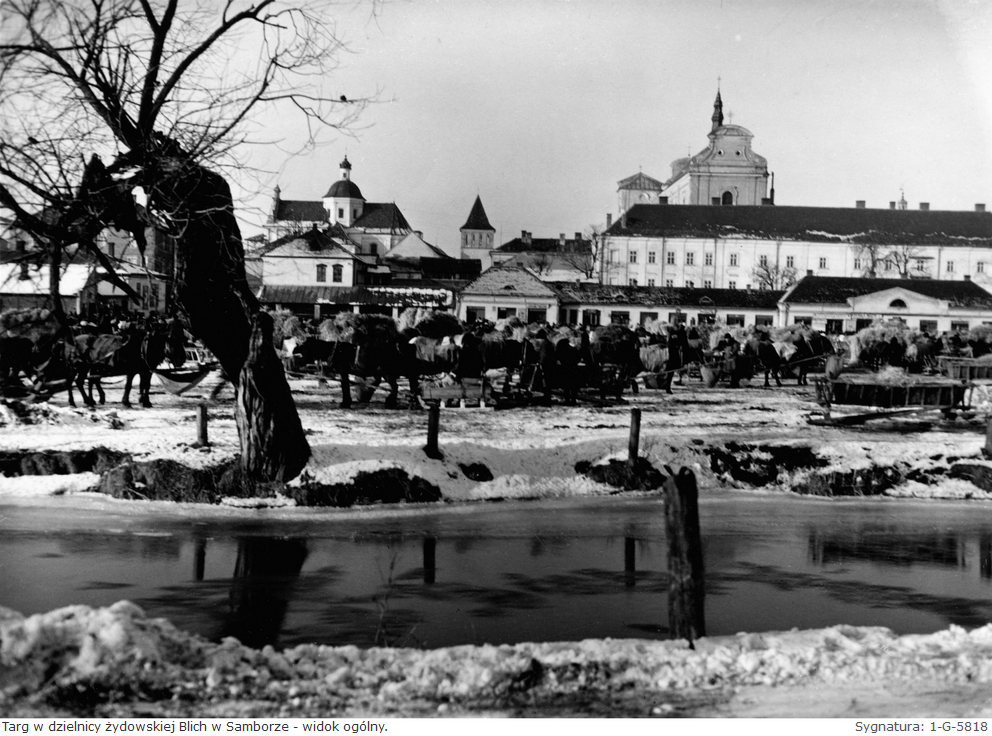
A marketplace in the Jewish neighbourhood

In the last days of June 1941, following the German invasion of the USSR, the Soviets executed an estimated 500 to 700 prisoners held in the Sambor prison. The German occupation of Sambor began on June 29, 1941. The discovery of the bodies of the prison massacre sparked an antisemitic pogrom. Around 50 Jews were killed by the Ukrainian militiamen.

In March 1942, an open ghetto was established in the city. In May, there were around 6,500 Jews in the ghetto because a lot of Jews had managed to flee before the German occupation. Between August and October 1942, there were four Jewish actions carried out in the village. The first action took place on August 4, 1942. A selection was organized in the stadium by the German gendarmerie, Ukrainian police and a team of the Security police. 150 Jews were murdered. On August 6, these Jews were transferred to Lviv. Other Jews were brought to the camp. During this action which lasted three days, 4,000 Jews were shot.

The second action took place on September 25–26, 1942. The Jewish Council selected 300 Jews who were shot in the forest of Ralivka, also called Radlowicze.

On October 17–18 and 22, 1942, a third and then fourth action was perpetrated by the German gendarmerie, Schutzpolizei, and the Ukrainian police. Jews were collected from the jail and from nearby villages.

During the third action, 1,000 Jews were sent to Belzec extermination camp and during the fourth action, 460 Jews were sent to Belzec. During the four actions which were perpetrated from August to October 1942, 5000 Jews were sent from Sambir to Belzec. The open ghetto became a closed ghetto in December 1942. Several actions took place in the ghetto from February to June 1943. During the first action, on February 13, 1943, 500 Jews were executed in the forest of Ralivka. On April 14, 1943, a second action was carried out during which 1,200 Jews were selected and 900 were shot in the cemetery.

On May 20–22, 1943, a third ghetto action was carried out and several hundreds of Jews “incapable of working” were shot in the forest of Ralivka. The liquidation of the ghetto took place on June 5, 1943, and 1,000 Jews were shot in the forest of Ralivka.

There were about 160 Jewish survivors, many of them hidden by local farmers, both Poles and Ukrainians.

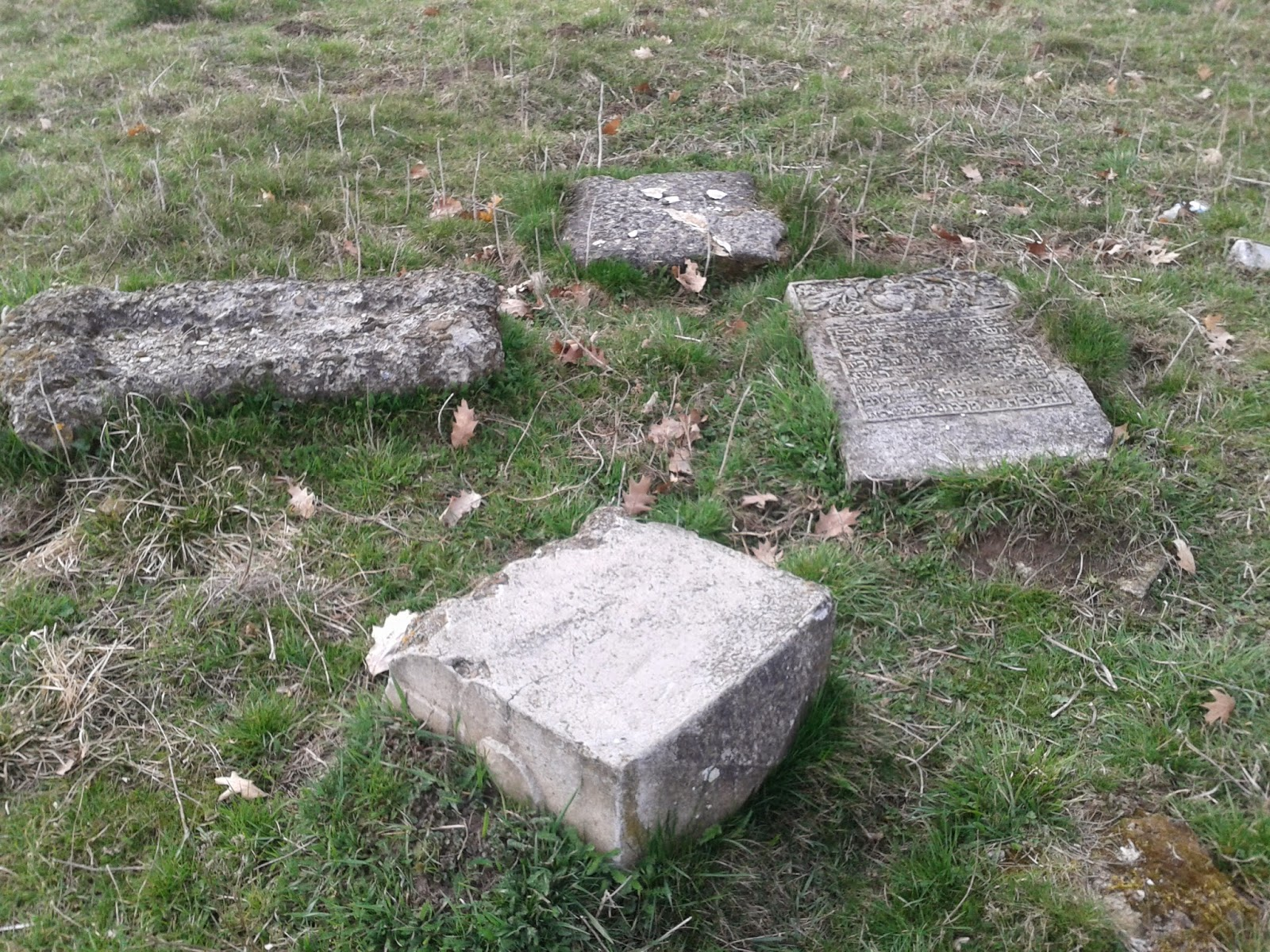
Remains of a Jewish cemetery

During the German occupation, Sambir's synagogue was plundered, and buildings of the Jewish quarter of Blich destroyed.

Around 2,000 Jews were shot at the Jewish cemetery in Sambir. Since the turn of the millennium, Mark Freiman, a descendant who emigrated to Canada, has been trying to restore the cemetery.

=== Postwar developments ===
In 1972 Soviet authorities liquidated the city's old Jewish cemetery, destroying many tombstones and using part of them for the construction of a chocolate factory. The new cemetery was likewise destroyed during that period, with a school being constructed on the site. During the 1990s three wooden crosses commemorating executed members of the Ukrainian Insurgent Army were installed on the site of the old Jewish cemetery.

Mark Freiman, a descendant who emigrated to Canada, has been trying to restore the cemetery.

== Points of interest ==
=== Church of Nativity of the Theotokos ===
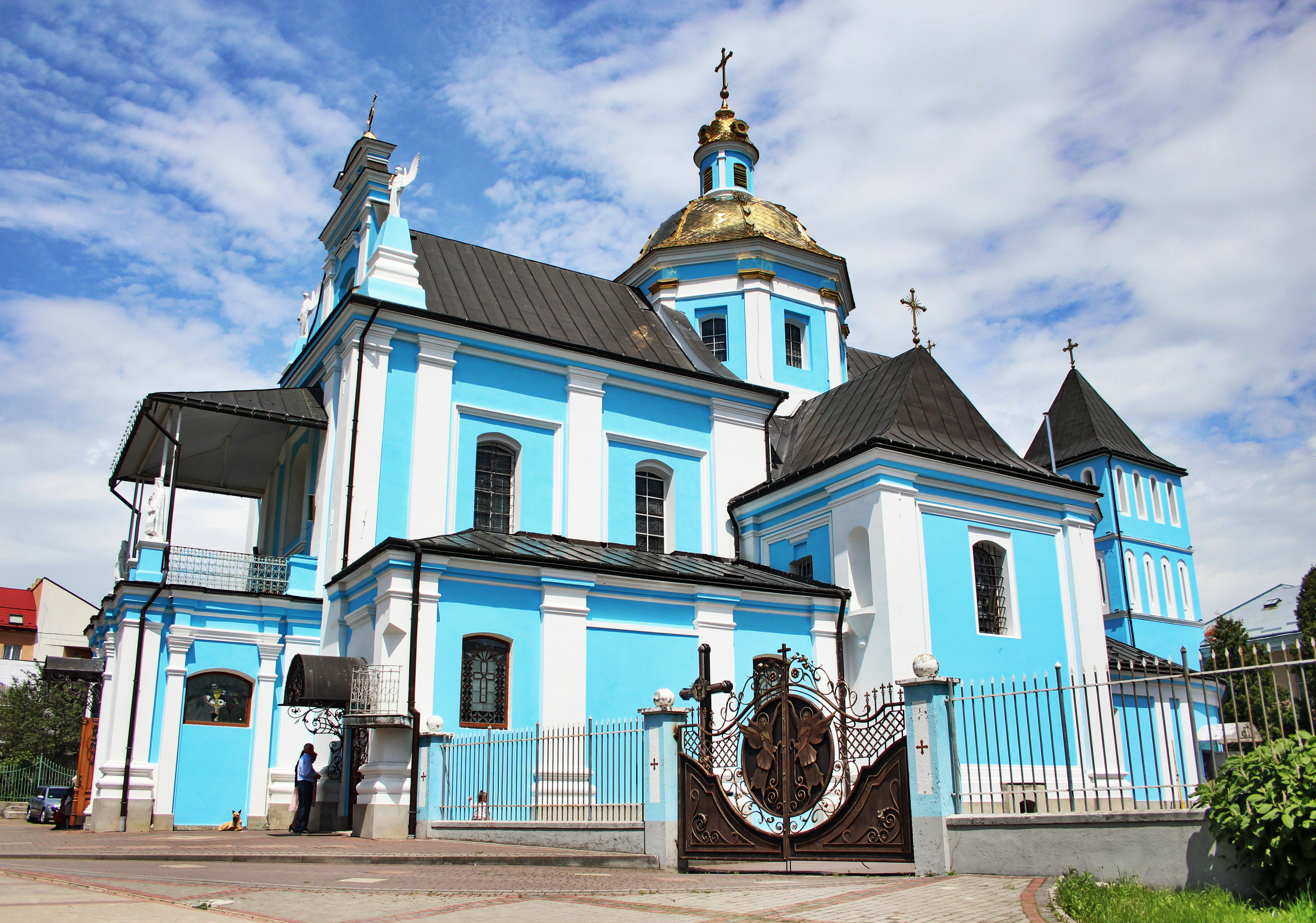
Church of Nativity of the Theotokos

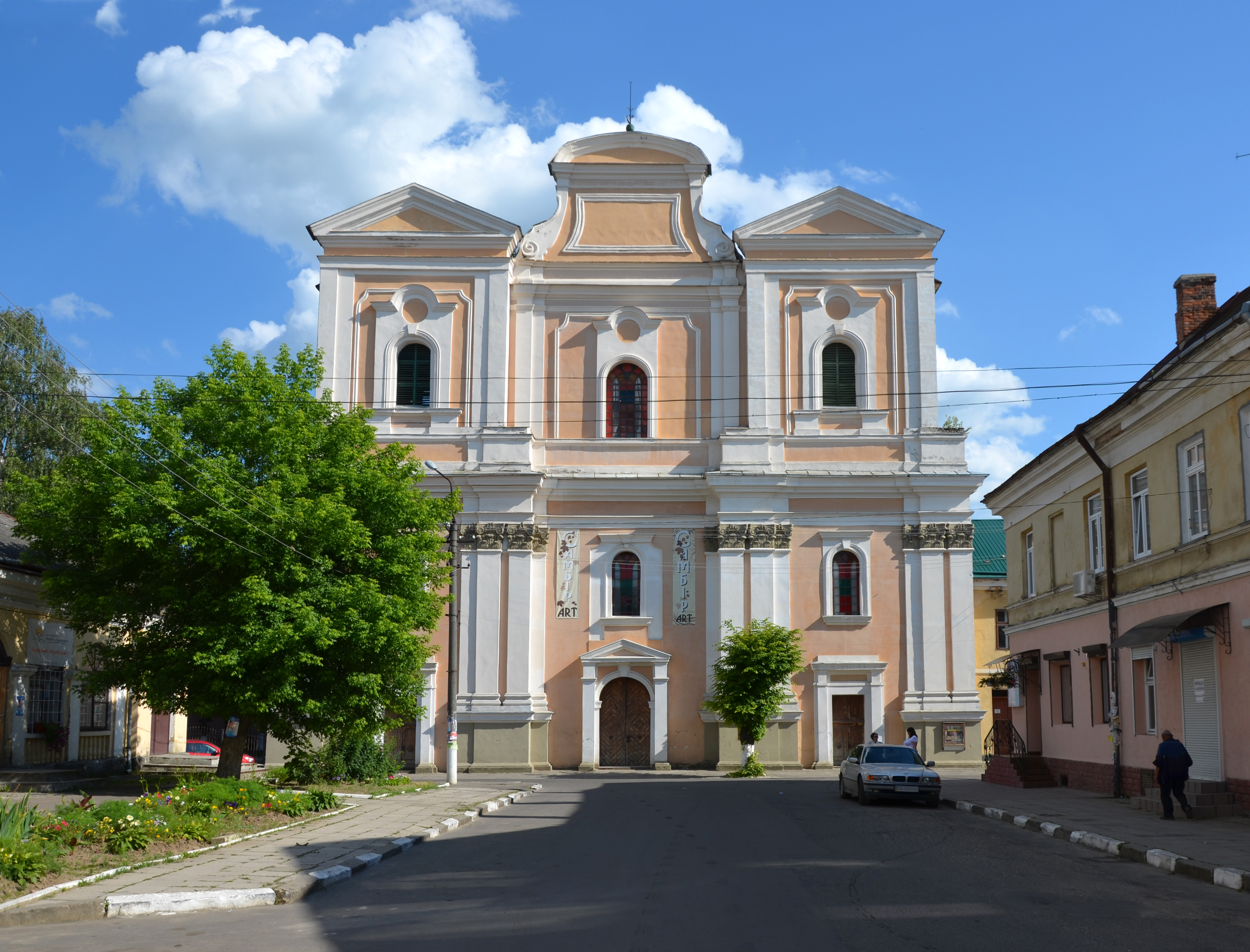
Church of the historical Jesuit monastery

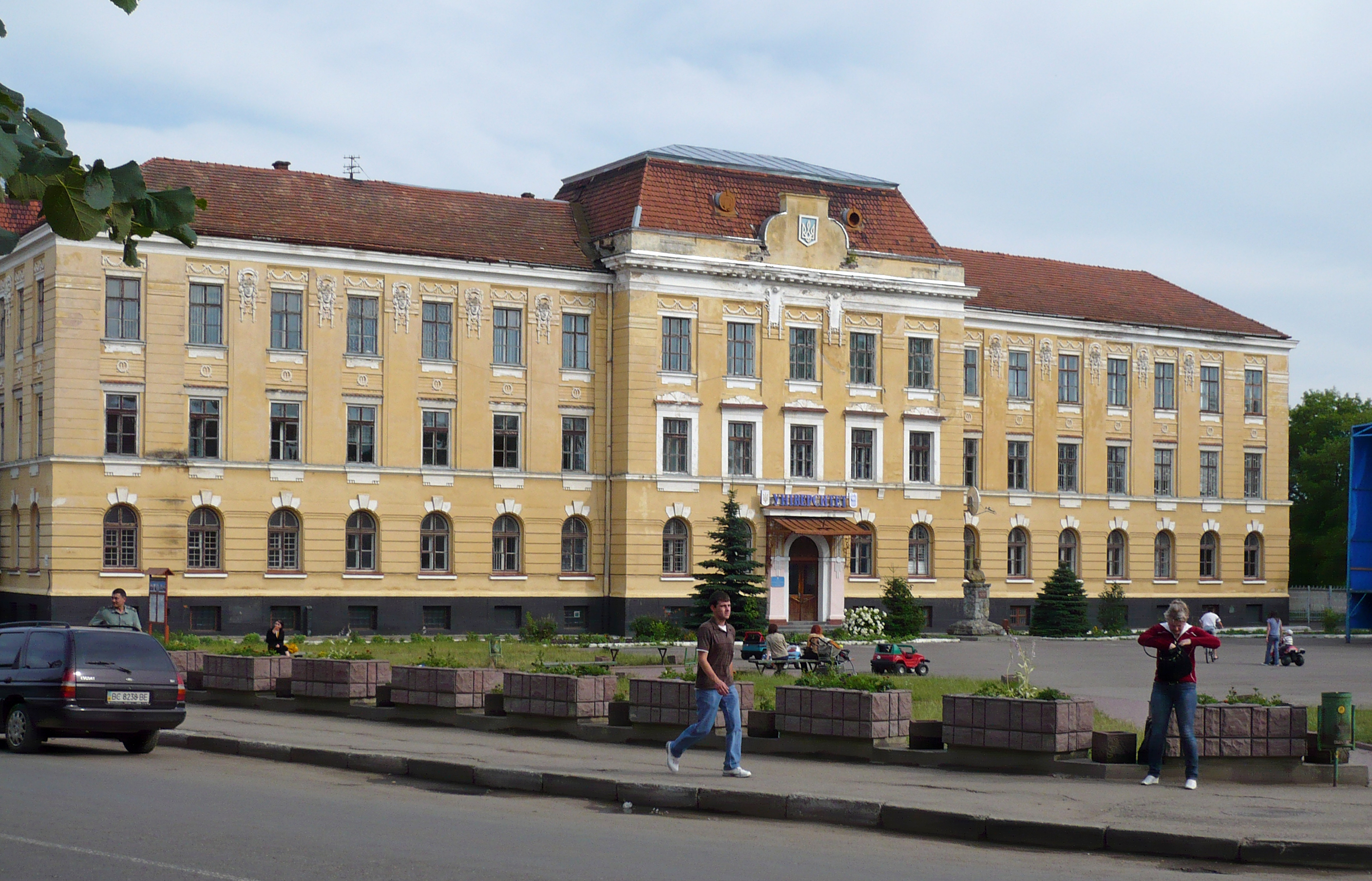
Former court building, later a university

Church of Nativity of the Theotokos in Sambir was built of wood after 1554, following a permission issued by Queen Bona. Up to that time Ruthenians had been forbidden from entering the city and had to use a church which stood outside of the walls. The decision to build the church provoked protests and complaints in the multi-confessional environment of the community of Sambir. However, the dispute was successfully resolved "in favor of the Lord" and the wooden church served until 1738, when it was rebuilt in stone.

The Baroque stone church, preserved with minor rearrangements and side-chapels (see photo) was built in 1738. Funds for its construction and design were donated by a wealthy family of Galician nobles, the Komarnickis. In 1814 a belfry was constructed nearby.

The architectural lines of the building have a simple and clear form. On the facade, a balcony and loft house statues of guardian angels. Inside, there is a painting by the artist-painter Yablonski.

=== Jesuit Monastery ===
A Jesuit monastery was established in Sambor in 1698 by Bracław voivode Chomentowski. In 1706 the construction of a Jesuit residence on the site of the former castle commenced. The Baroque monastery church of the Nativity of Christ was erected between 1709–1751. After the dissolution of Jesuits in 1773 the building was used as a military depot. After 1823 it was restored for the needs of a local gymnasium located on the premises of the nearby Jesuit college (1756–1759). In 1847 the church restored its function under the Bernardine Order and was reconsecrated in honour of the Assumption. After reconstruction in 1981–1986 an organ hall has been functioning in the church building.

=== Local Court building ===
Constructed in 1906–1909 on the site of a former Bernardine monastery to house the powiat court, under Soviet rule the building was used by the military. In 1999 a faculty of Drohobych Pedagogical University was opened at the location, however soon thereafter the building was abandoned and currently remains unused.

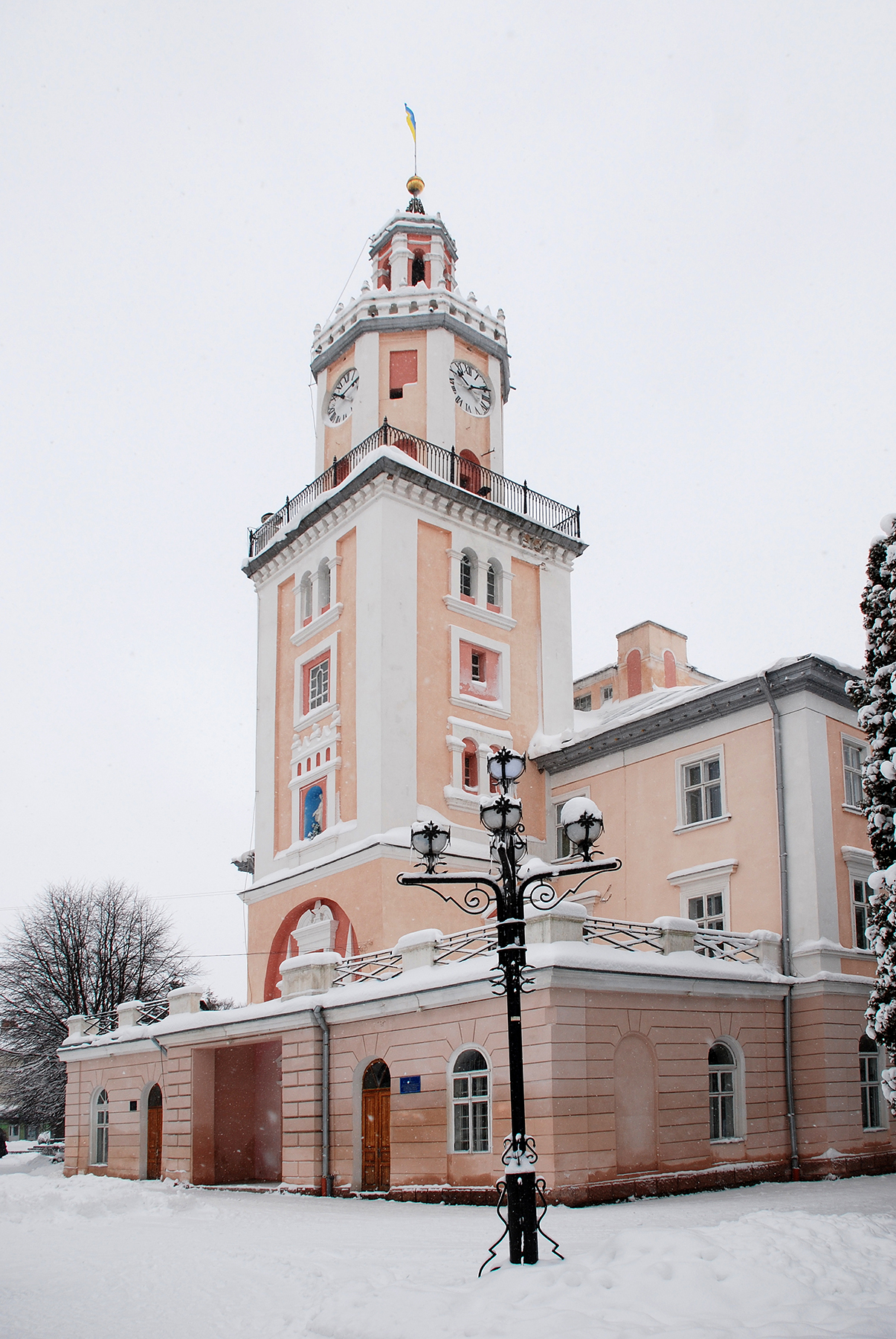
Town hall

=== Missionary Collegium ===
In 1715–1727 a collegium building housing for members of missionary congregation was constructed in Baroque style. For some time it housed a seminary. After the congregation's dissolution in 1786 the building was used as a priestly residence and included a library. After the Second World War a maternity ward was located on the premises, and starting from 1988 it has been used as a museum.

=== Town Hall ===
Sambir's current town hall was built in 1638–1670 in Renaissance style after the preceding structure had burned down. In 1844 it was reconstructed in the spirit of Austrian architecture.

== Time zone ==
In Sambir and throughout Ukraine there is one time zone: the official Kyiv time. Every year there is a transition to summer and winter time on the last Sunday of March at 3:00, which is 1 hour ahead and the last Sunday of October at 4:00 on 1 hour ago.

== International relations ==
The distance from Sambir to major cities by road:
(Ukraine) Kyiv ~ 623 km (Ukraine) Lviv ~ 75 km (Ukraine) Kharkiv ~ 1100 km (Ukraine) Donetsk ~ 1310 km (Ukraine) Luhansk ~ 1435 km (Ukraine) Staryi Sambir ~ 18 km (Ukraine) Uzhhorod ~ 175 km	(Russia) Moscow ~ 1477 km (Poland) Warsaw ~ 439 km (Poland) Przemyśl ~ 66 km (Slovakia) Bratislava ~ 773 km (Hungary) Budapest ~ 565 km (Romania) Bucharest ~ 830 km

=== Twin towns — Sister cities ===
Sambir is twinned with:

- (Ukraine) Sloviansk;
- (Poland) Brzozów;
- (Poland) Kostrzyn nad Odrą;
- (Poland) Oświęcim;
- (Poland) Sosnowiec;
- (Germany) Breisach am Rhein
- (Germany) Kerpen
- (Germany) Küstriner Vorland

== Notable people ==
- Wladyslaw Abraham (1860–1941) – Polish lawyer and scientist, father of Roman Abraham,
- Volodymyr Bachynskyi (1880–1927) – Ukrainian politician, lawyer, organizer of the Ukrainian National Democratic Union, biggest Ukrainian political party in the Second Polish Republic.
- Wiktor Biegański (1892–1974) – Polish actor, film director and screenwriter,
- Valeriy Borzov (born 1949) – Ukrainian sprint athlete, two-time Olympian, a former president of the National Olympic Committee of Ukraine, and Minister for Youth and Sports of Ukraine.
- Wladyslaw Byrka (1878–1945) – Polish lawyer, economist and politician. Chairman of PKO Bank Polski, deputy speaker of the Sejm,
- Andrii Chaikovskyi (1857–1935) – Ukrainian writer, public figure, Esperantist, doctor of law, lawyer in Galicia
- Zacharias Dische (1895–1988) – biochemist
- Ernst Eichel (1907 – c. 1956) – violinist, as a conductor assumed the name of 'Ernest Borsamsky',
- Maria Wanda Jastrzębska (1924–1988) – Polish electronics engineer and academic
- Stefan Kaczmarz (1895–1939) – Polish mathematician
- Mykola Kolessa (1903–2006) – Ukrainian composer
- Petro Konashevych-Sahaidachny (1582–1622) – Ukrainian nobleman, commander and political leader, Hetman of Zaporozhian Cossacks (1616-1622), military leader of Polish–Lithuanian Commonwealth. Organizer of successful campaigns against the Crimean Khanate, the Ottoman Empire and the Muscovite Empire
- Les Kurbas (1887–1937) – Ukrainian movie and theater director
- Andriy Kuzmenko (1968–2015) – (aka Kuzma Skryabin) Ukrainian singer, composer, poet, writer, TV presenter, producer, actor. Leader and founder of the popular Ukrainian rock band Skryabin.
- Henry Lehrman (1881–1946) – motion picture director
- Juliusz Makarewicz (1872–1955) – senator in the Second Polish Republic, legal expert, professor of Lwow University
- Tadeusz Pankiewicz (1908–1993) – Polish Pharmacist - Holocaust Rescue - awarded recognition as a "Righteous Among the Nations" for his wartime activities in rescuing Jews
- Walter Polovchak (born Volodymyr Polovchak, 1967) – Ukrainian migrant to the United States, who became the subject of Polovchak v. Meese.
- Hryhoriy Samborchyk (Hryhoriy Chui Vigilantius) (1523–1573) – Ukrainian scientist, Renaissance poet (wrote in Latin and Polish), humanist, professor at the University of Kraków.
- Jozef Skowyra (born 1941) – Polish politician, deputy to the Sejm
- Eduard Steuermann (1892–1964) – pianist, pupil of Ferruccio Busoni
- Zygmunt Steuermann (1899–1941), football player
- Bohdan Tkachyk (born 1951), Ukrainian painter, public figure
- Kasper Twardowski (1583–1641) - Polish poet
- Marina Mniszech (1588–1614) – daughter of a Polish noble (Jerzy (George) Mniszech, palatine of Sandomierz, starosta of Sambor), Tsarina of Muscovy as the wife of Tsar Dmitri the Pretender during the Time of Troubles in the 17th century.
- Salka Viertel (1889–1978) – Hollywood screenwriter and memoirist.
- Jan Bart (1919–1971) – Cantor and Yiddish Entertainer

== Gallery ==
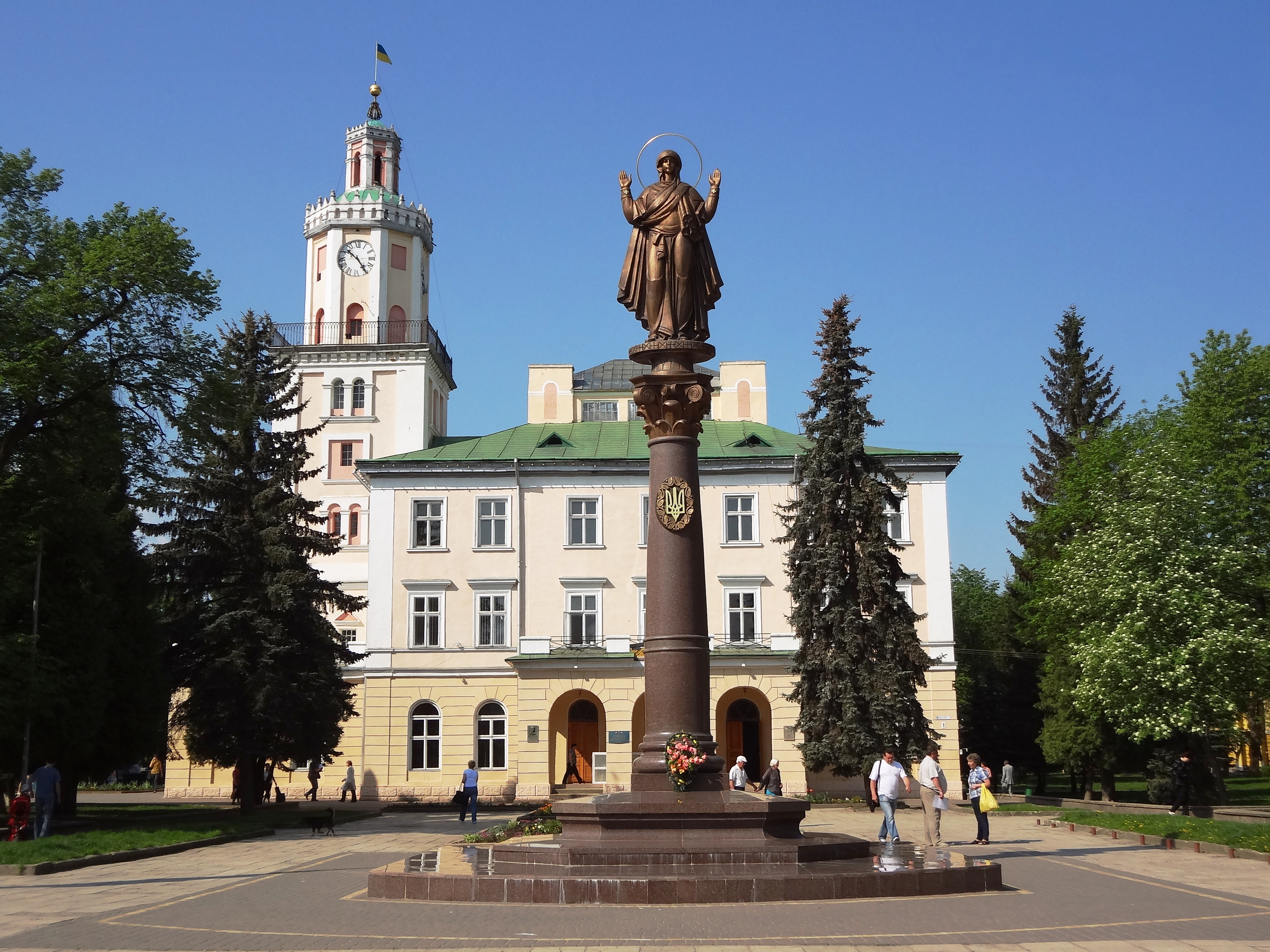
Market Square

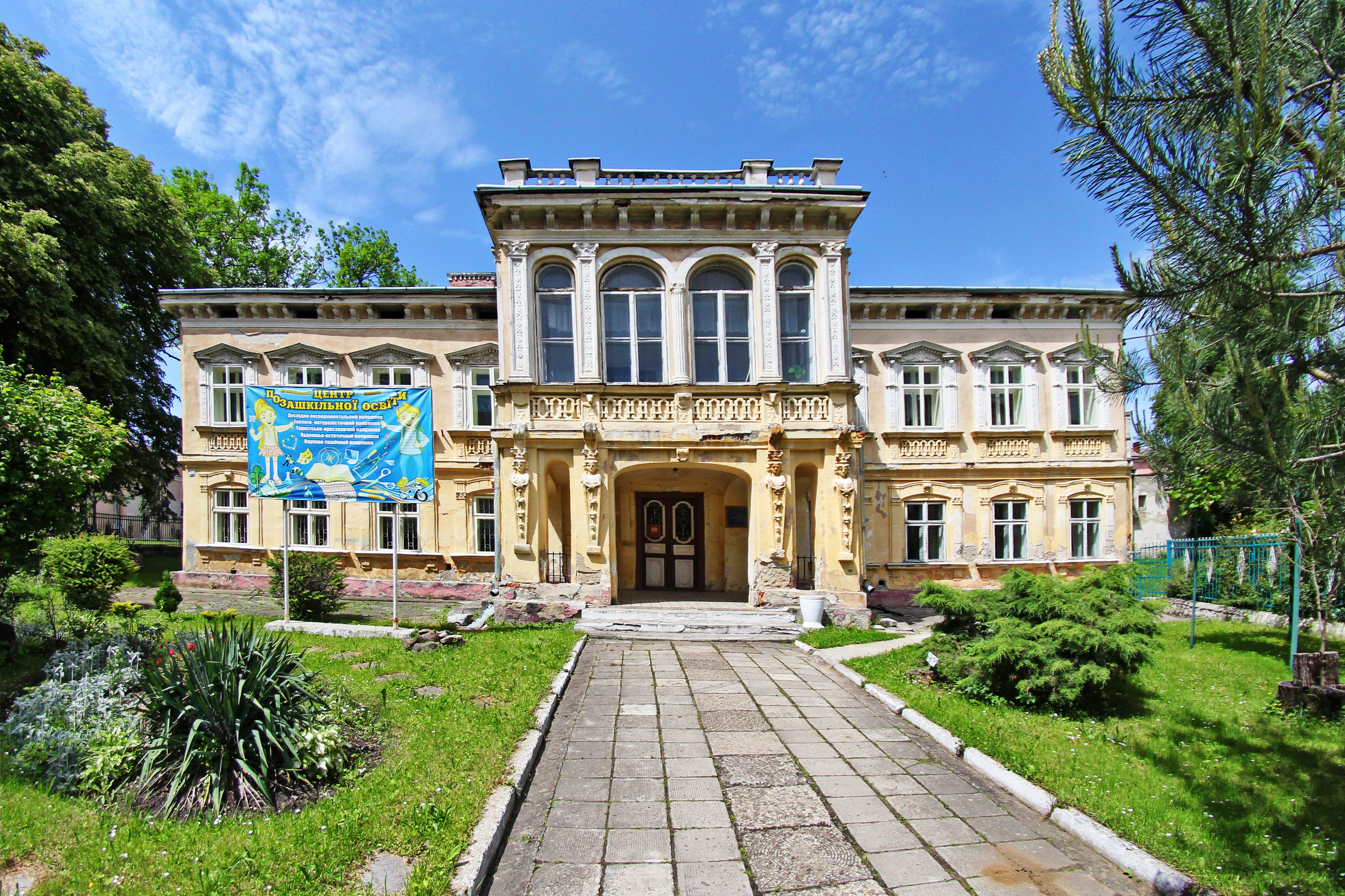
A villa in Mazepy Street

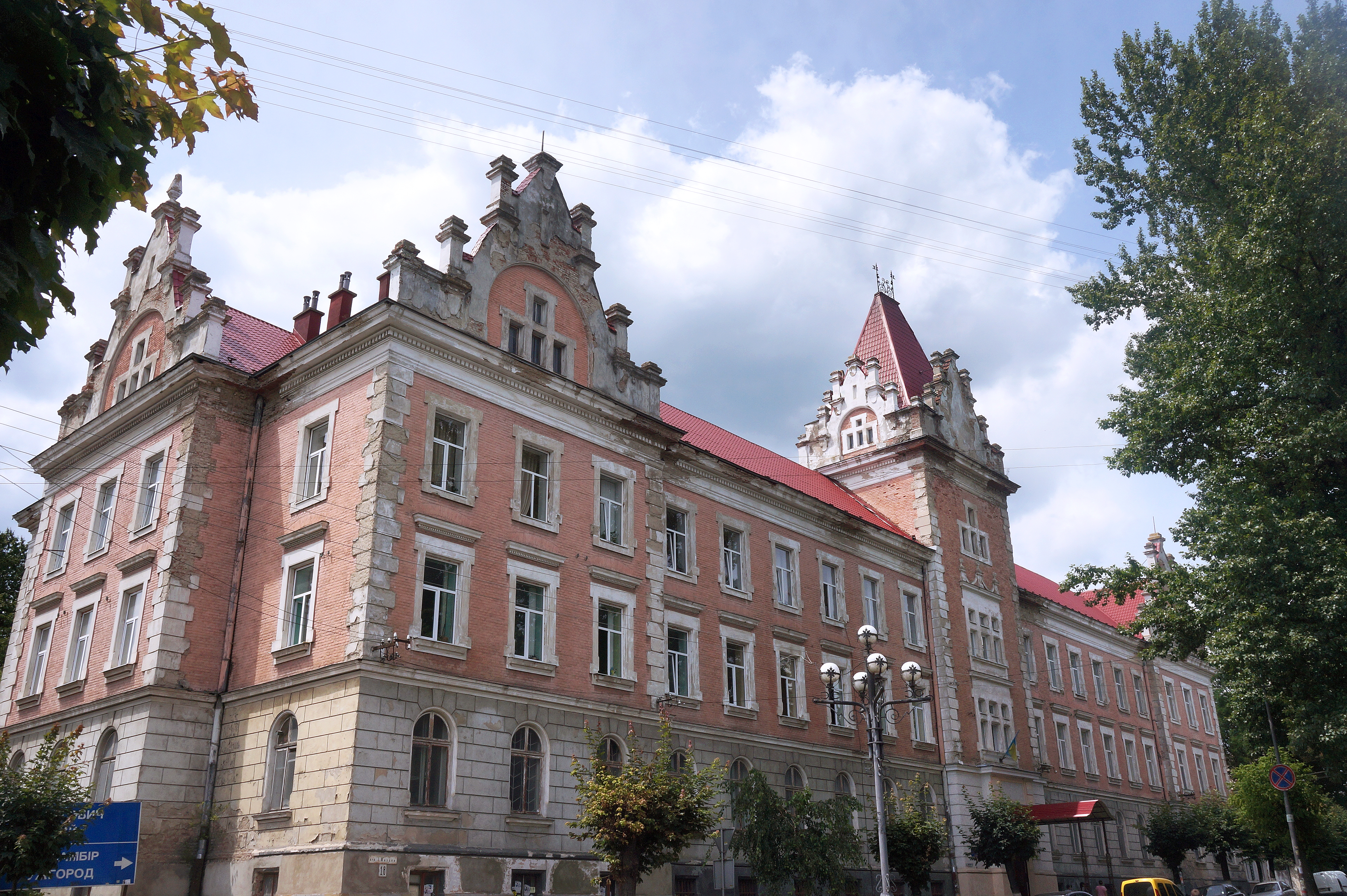
Treasury Government Directorate

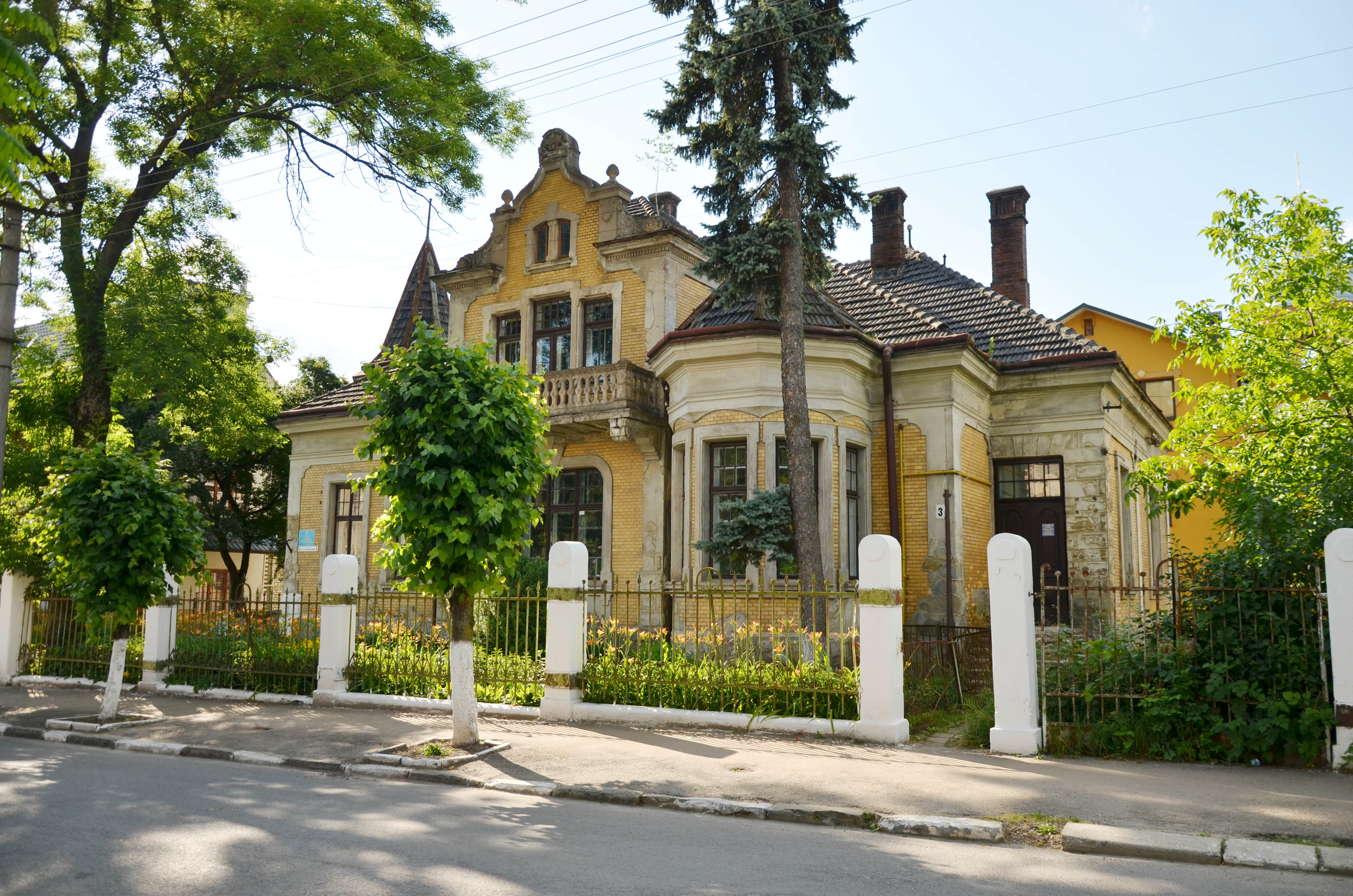
A villa in Stebelskoho Street

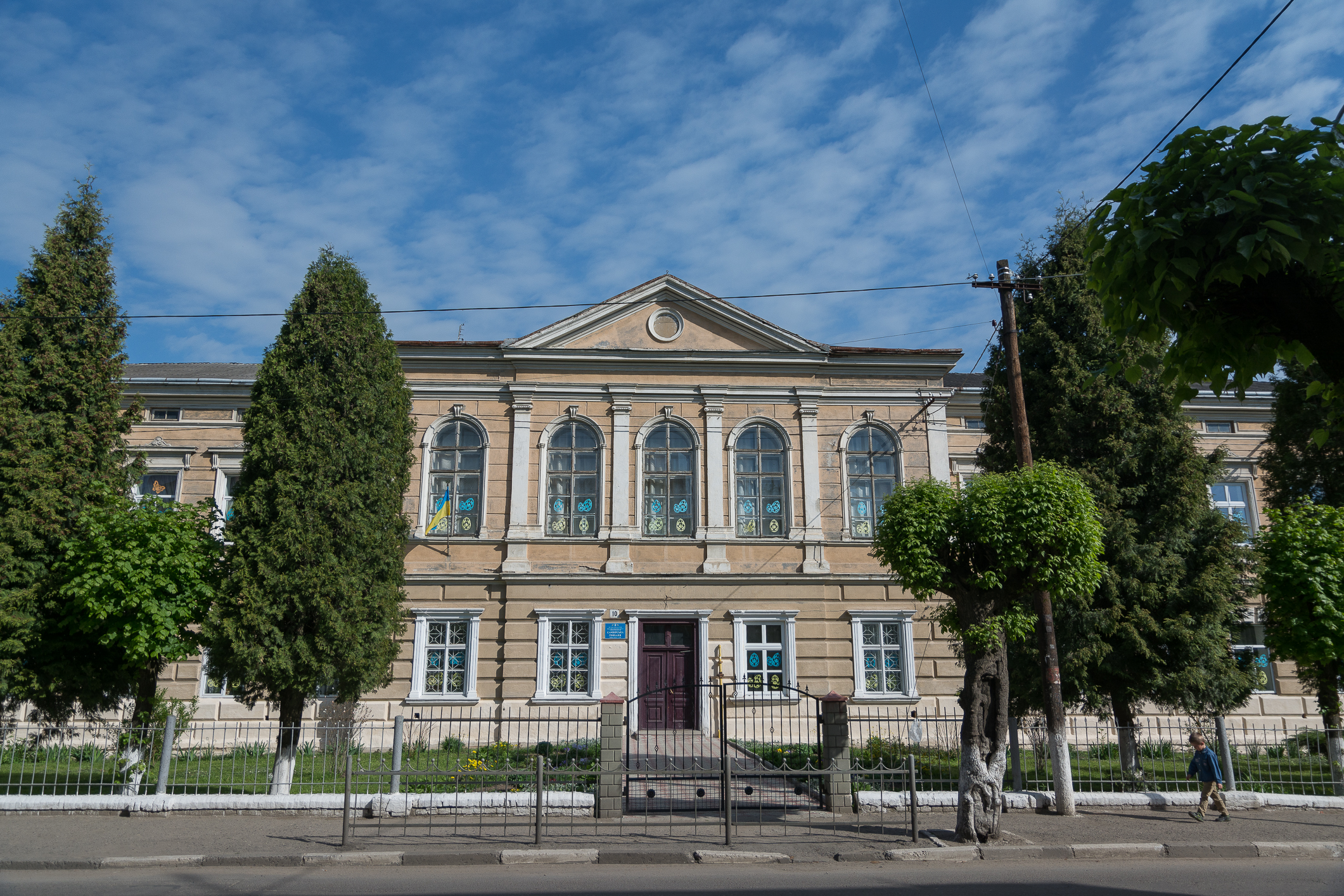
Gymnasium building

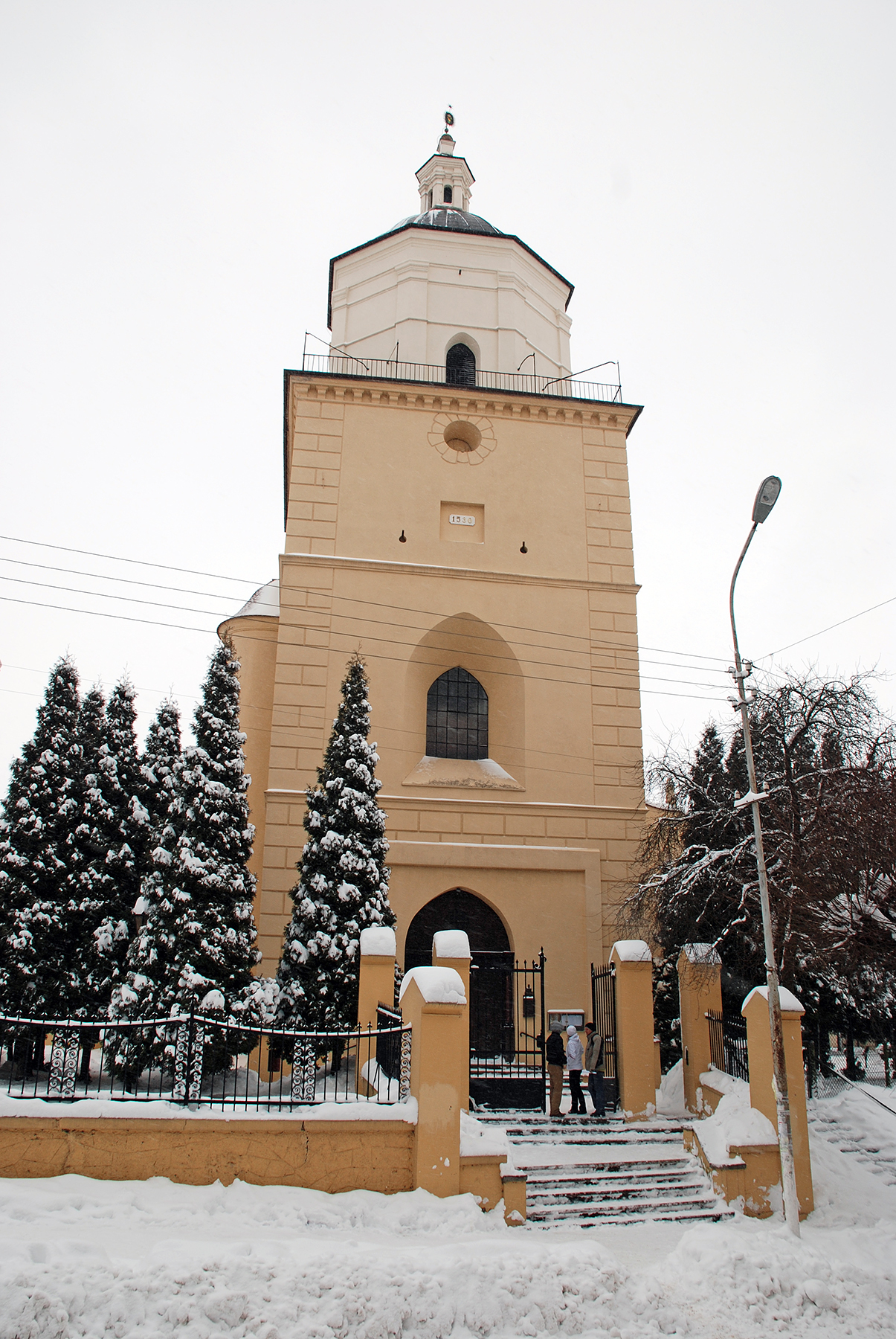
Church of St. John the Baptist

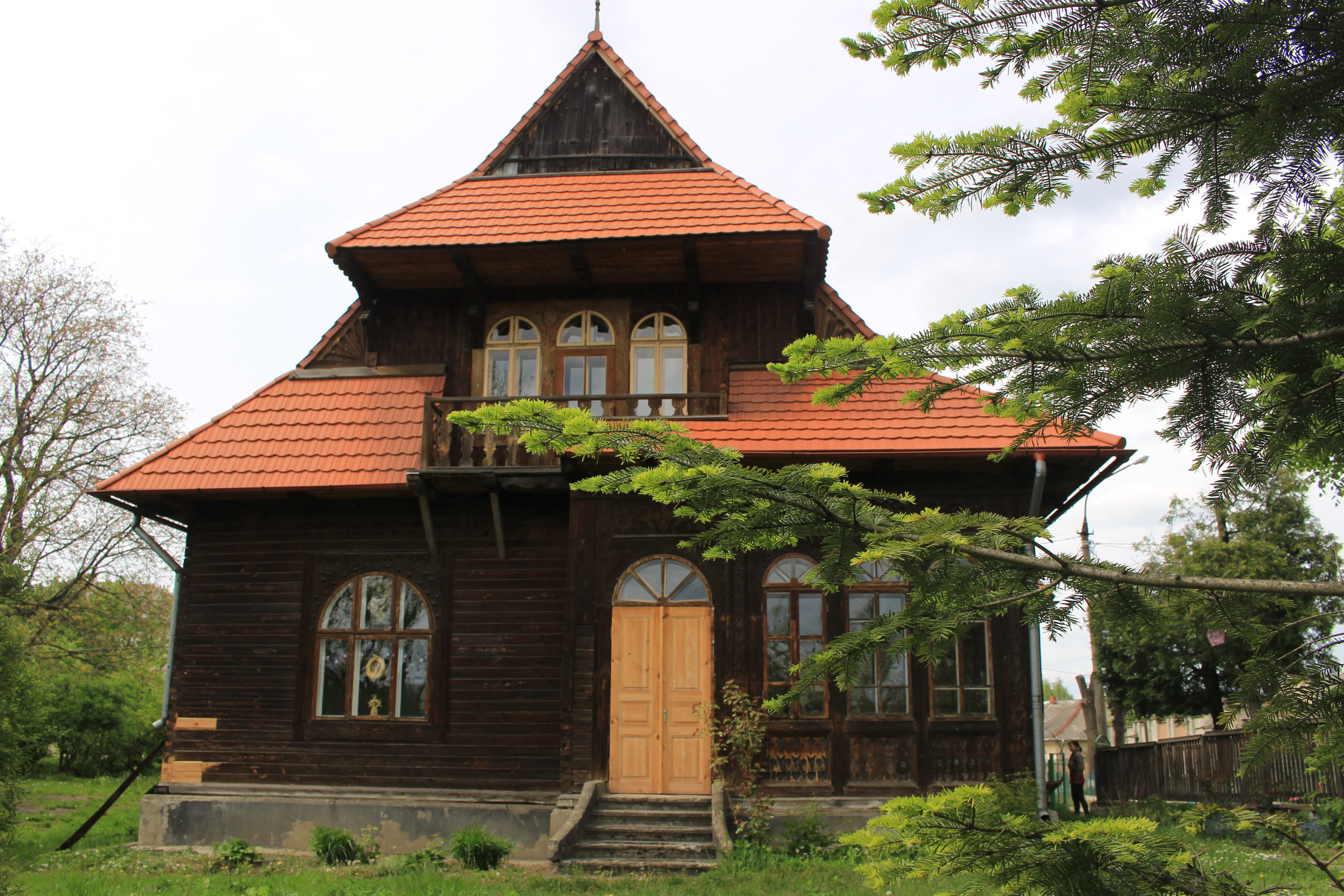
A wooden villa on Kurbasa Street

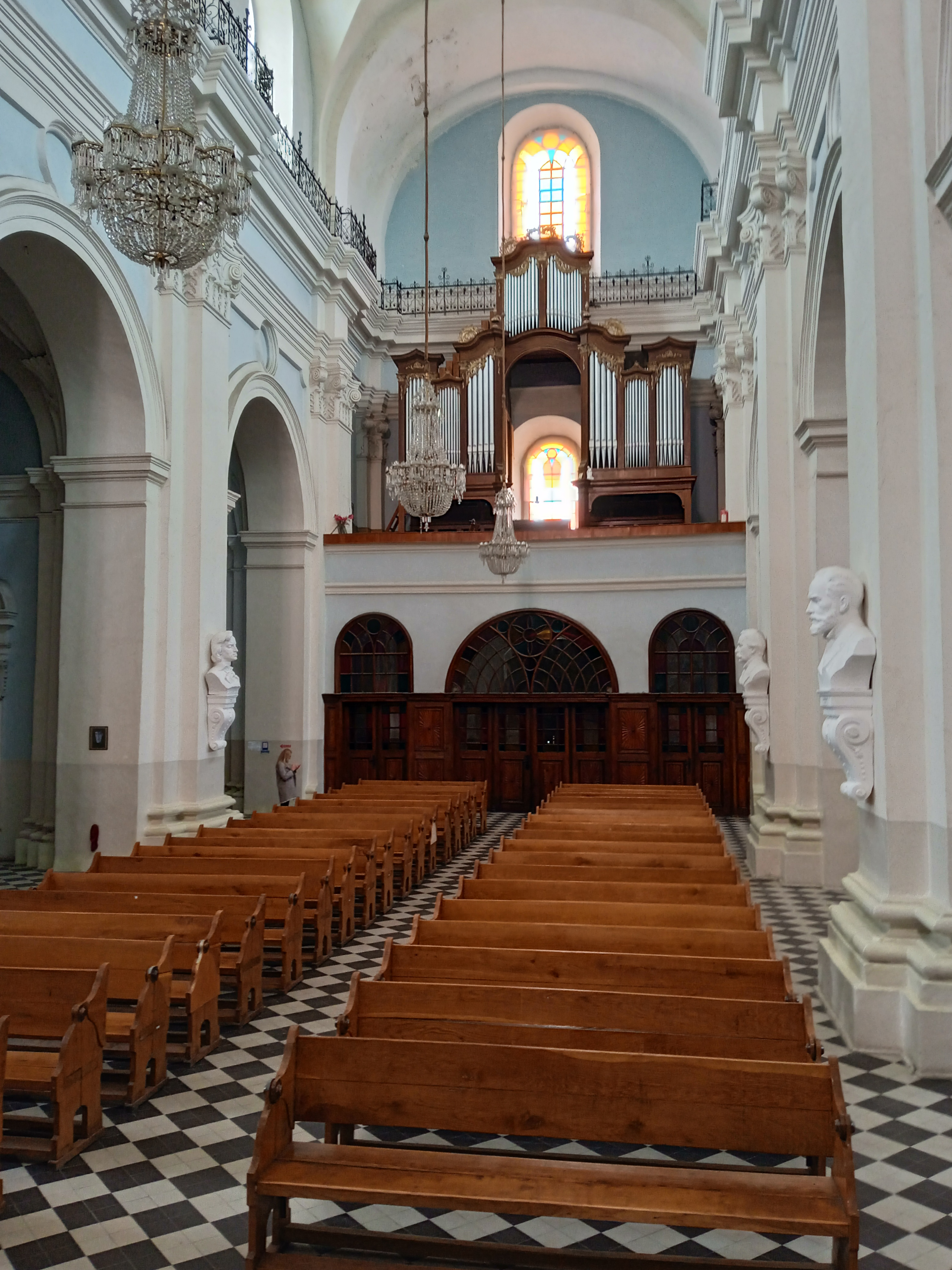
Interior of St. Stanislaw's Church (now an organ hall)

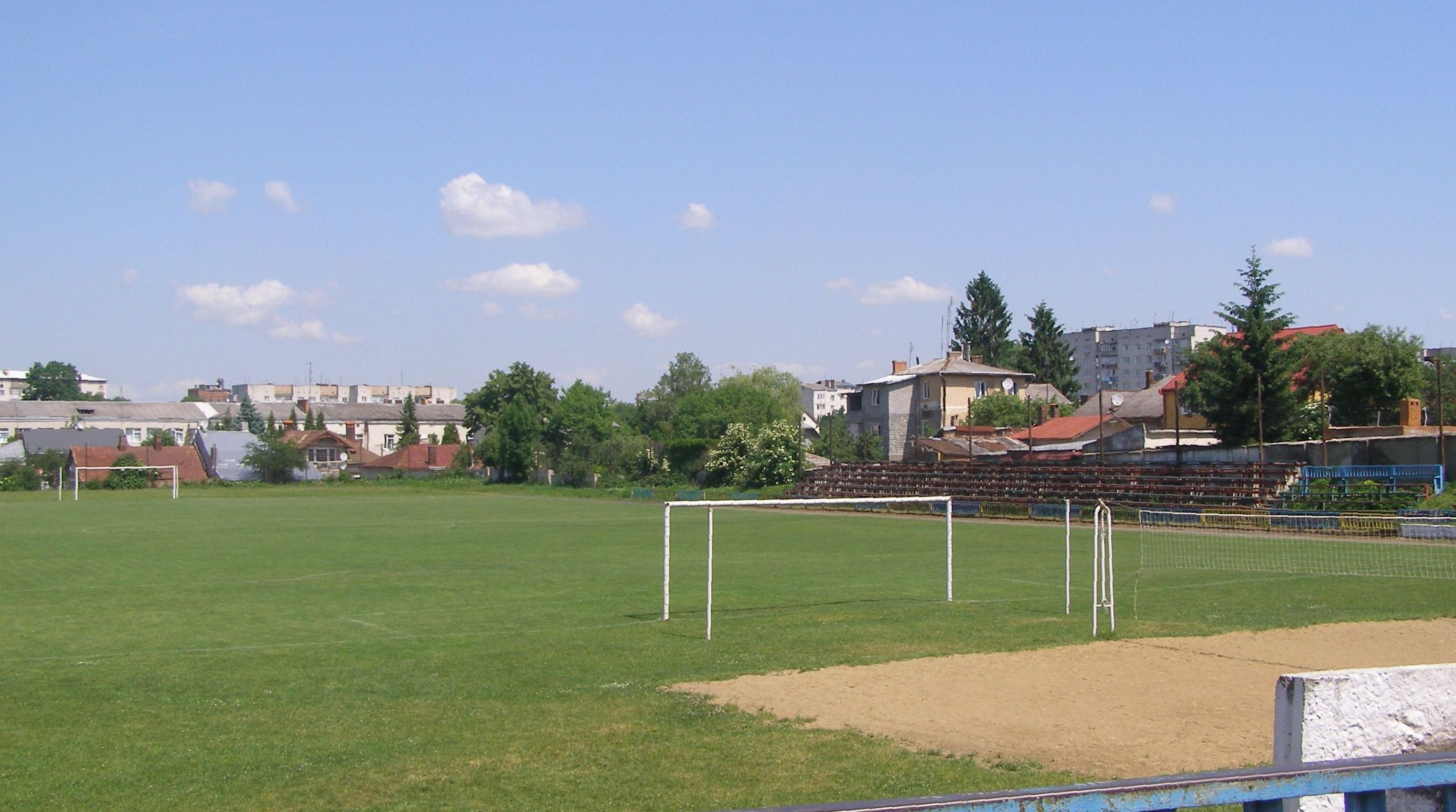
City stadium

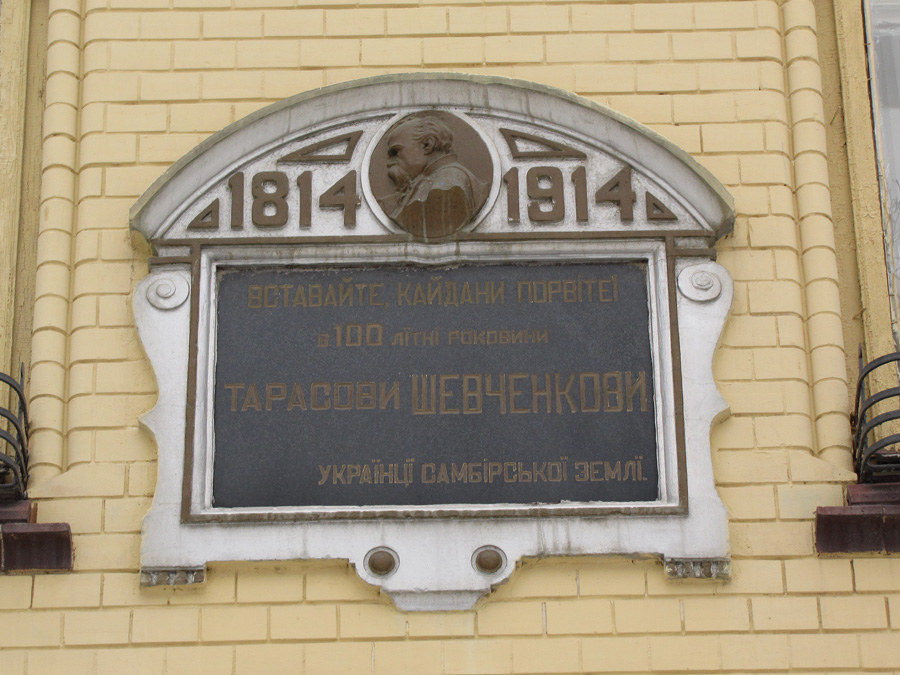
Memorial plaque dedicated to the centenary of Taras Shechenko
