= Kasper Twardowski =

Polish poet

Kasper Twardowski (ca. 1592 – ca. 1641) was a Polish poet of the early Polish Baroque period, representing the so-called metaphysical or metaphysical-and-devotional line of poets. Little is known of his personal life. Twardowski was most likely born in Sambor (now Sambir) into the well-off family of the local tailor, and spent his youth in Kraków (Cracow), Poland, where he is assumed to have studied at the Jagiellonian University (then known as the Kraków Academy). In 1629 Twardowski moved probably to Lwów (Lviv), where he died. Twardowski is best known for his erotica called "the Cupid's Lessons", banned by the bishop of Kraków, and later rejected by the poet himself as immoral; blamed for his own poor health as the apparent wrath of God.

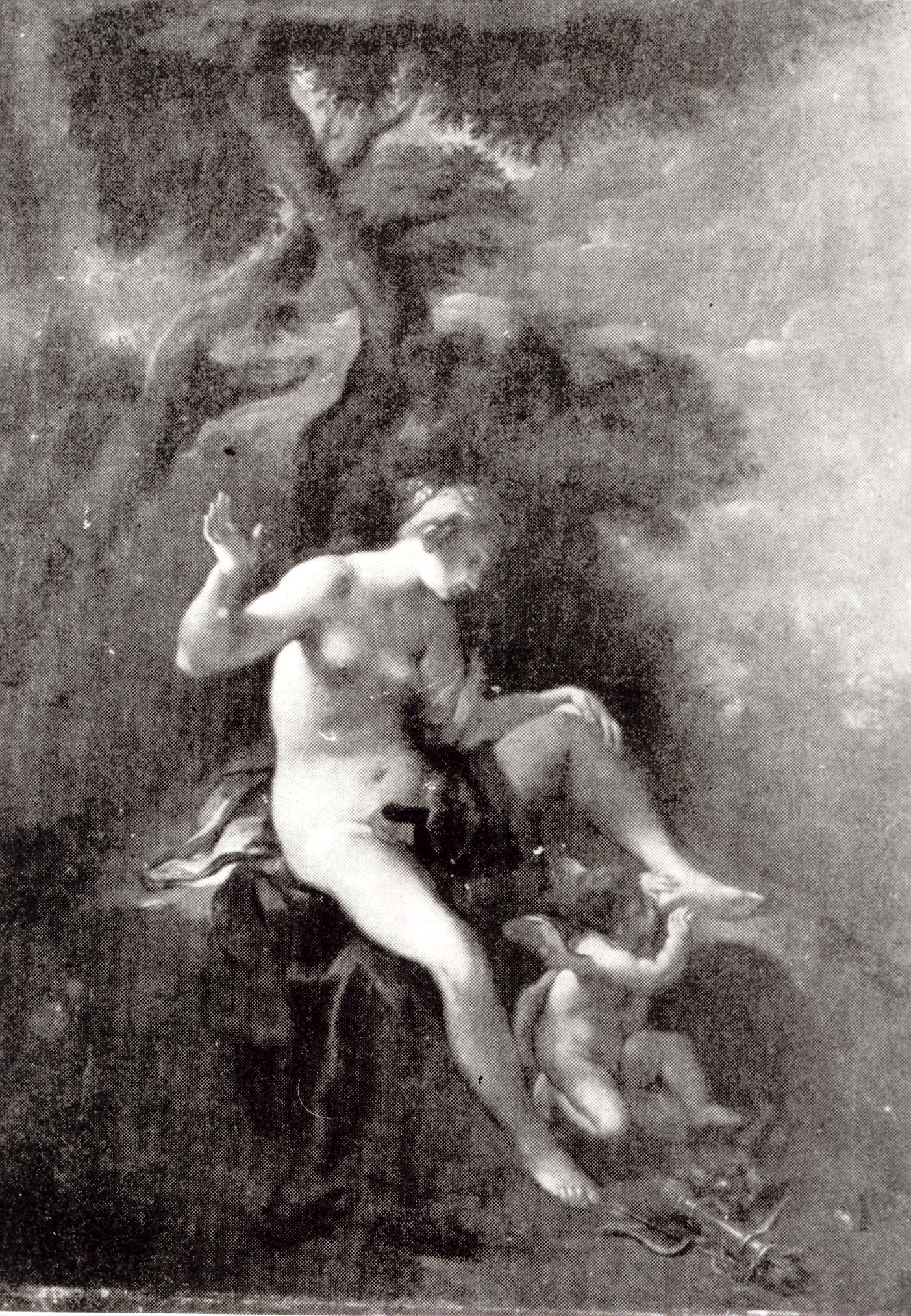
"Wenus i kupidyn" (Venus and Cupid, 1600s). Oil painting by Albani removed from Poland by the Nazis during World War II. Never seen again

== Poet convert ==
Kasper Twardowski debuted in 1617 as the author of a 12-part poem entitled "Lekcyje Kupidynowe" (Cupid's Lessons), modelled on the Latin "quinqua linea amoris" describing five steps to love from gaze, talk, and touch, to kiss, and intimate union. The work did not survive in its published original; only in hand-written copies which, nevertheless, allow for its full reconstruction. Following publication, the poem was condemned and indexed by the ecclesiastical censorship of the Royal City of Kraków with Bishop Marcin Szyszkowski. Soon after, the poet experienced a grave illness, which was described in the Preface to his subsequent works. Twardowski blamed his erotica for getting ill. Helped by the nuns, he reconciled himself to God and was admitted to the Jesuit religious brotherhood called the Congregation of the Assumption of the Blessed Virgin Mary (Kongregacja Wniebowzięcia Najświętszej Marii Panny).

The poem "Cupid's Lessons" begins with a short invocation entitled To the Reader ("Do Czytelnika") and ends with a 14-line lament ("Lament na to") over the protagonist's own handle (or trzonek in Polish) gone soft with the sight of a female chaperone. The work is composed of 12 strophes written in hendecasyllabic meter, 11 syllables per line.

Do Czytelnika
Ja z Kupidynowej szkoły
idąc do domu wesoły,
rad bym, żeby mej łaciny
nauczył się i kto iny.
Jeśli dobrze repetuję,
niechaj łaskę twoję czuję;
a ten, komu nie smakuje,
niechaj po swemu miłuje.

Just as "the Cupid's Lessons" were a kind of "Ars Amandi", so was Twardowski's subsequent output as the poet-convert. In 1618 he published his other famous work called A boatful of young people floating to shore ("Łódź młodzi z nawałności do brzegu płynąca"), an allegorical poem for the young, modelled after the "Confessions" of St. Augustine, describing his own return to the circle of the pious.

=== A new-found devotion ===
For the rest of his life Twardowski remained faithful to his new-found religiosity, mulling over spiritual matters in all his subsequent works. One of his most important later achievements was The torch of God's Love with the five arrows of fire ("Pochodnia Miłości Bożej z piącią strzał ognistych") published in 1628 – a fervently religious piece of considerable significance in the genre of Polish "metaphysical poetry" of the 16th–17th century. Twardowski's devotion grew out of Counter Reformation, even though, his poetry did not. His aesthetics are now considered a part of Counter Reformation particularly relevant in the contexts of artistic legacy of the Jesuit Societas Iesu regardless of the fact that the poet promoted only his own personal road to salvation, and remained neutral in the matters of religious controversy, away from the typical of his own period Catholic confrontations with Protestantism.

== Later research and literary analysis ==
In many modern analyses (e.g., Cz. Hernasa ) all three of Twardowski’s major works including The Cupid's lessons, A boatful of young people, and The torch of God's Love, are interpreted as the unintentional, though consistent literary trilogy, demonstrating the development of the poet through different life-stages. Often perceived as his single greatest achievement in the field of literature, they have been published together along with his life story. The first and only monograph about Twardowski appeared in 1939 written by Ludwik Kamykowski; while the actual poems have been re-released thanks to Radosław Grześkowiak and Krzysztof Mrówcewicz. The most important modern interpretations of the artistic legacy of Kasper Twardowski's work as part of the Baroque period in Poland, are provided by researchers: Eugeniusz Trzaska, Ludwik Kamykowski, Ryszard Montusiewicz, Radosław Grześkowiak, Krzysztof Mrowcewicz and Adam Urbanik.

== Works by Kasper Twardowski ==
The most widely held works by Kasper Twardowski include:

- Lekcyje Kupidynowe (Cupid's Lessons), 1617
- Łódź młodzi z nawałności do brzegu płynąca (The boatful of young people floating to shore), 1618
- Kolęda. Nowe lato. Szczodry dzień abo piosneczki Emmanuelowe (The Carol. New summer. Bountiful days or the Emmanuel songs), 1619
- Kolęda. Nowe lato. Szczodry dzień (The Carol. New summer. A bountiful Day), 1623
- Bicz Boży abo krwawe łzy utrapionej Matki Ojczyzny Polskiej (Scourge of God, or bloody tears of Polish mournful Motherland), 1625
- Pochodnia Miłosci Bożej z piącią strzał ognistych (The torch of God's Love with five arrows of fire), 1628
- Bij Gustawa, kto dobry. Pobudka utrapionej Ojczyzny (Beat Gustav, who in the right mind. Reveille mournful Homeland), 1629
- Bylica świętojańska (St. John's Artemisia), 1630
- Gęś świętego Marcina (St. Martin's Goose), 1630
- Katafalk Aleksandrowi księciu Zasławskiemu (Catafalque for Prince Alexander Zasławski), 1630
- Kolebka Jezusowa. Pasterze. Trzej krolowie (A cradle of Jesus. Pastors. The three kings), 1630 or 1632
- Najjaśniejszej Konstancjej krolowej polskiej [...] obchod nieodżałowanej śmierci (Serene Queen Constance of Poland [...] celebration of much lamented death), 1631
