= Opole University of Technology =

Technical university in Opole, Poland

- Politechnika Opolska
- Type: Public University
- Established: 1966
- Affiliations: Socrates/Erasmus+, CEEPUS, TEMPUS, Copernicus, Leonardo da Vinci
- Rector: habil. PhD Eng. Marcin Lorenc
- Students: 4,626 (12.2023)
- Location: Prószkowska 76; 45-758 Opole, Opole, Poland; 50°40′55″N 17°56′36″E
- Website: http://www.po.opole.pl/

Opole University of Technology (Polish name: Politechnika Opolska; sometimes referred to in English as Technical University of Opole) is a university located in Opole, Poland.

The university was founded in 1959 as a consultative branch of Silesian University of Technology. In 1966 it became an independent university known as Wyższa Szkoła Inżynierska w Opolu (Higher School of Engineering in Opole). The name Politechnika Opolska (Opole University of Technology) has been used since 1996.

The university has over 500 lecturers and over 9,000 students. There are seven faculties:

- Faculty of Civil Engineering and Architecture
- Faculty of Mechanical Engineering
- Faculty of Electrical Engineering, Automatic Control and Computer Science
- Faculty of Physical Education and Physiotherapy
- Faculty of Economics and Management
- Faculty of Production Engineering and Logistics
- Faculty of Technical Systems Engineering

In 2008, the Opole University of Technology in cooperation with the Beijing University of Technology opened the Opole Confucius Institute. Centre for Cooperation Poland-China Confucius Institute is a non-profit public utility institution whose mission is promoting the Chinese language and culture. The Institute is working for the benefit of this University and the Opole local community. The Opole Centre is one of the 200 such offices in the world associated in an international web, whose principal office Hanban (Office of Chinese Language Council International) is situated in Beijing.

The Opole University of Technology is also an individual full member of the European University Association (EUA). The EUA represents and supports higher education institutions in 46 countries, providing them with a forum to cooperate and keep abreast of the latest trends in higher education and research policies.
