= Facing the Truth =

Facing the Truth may refer to:

- Facing the Truth (TV programme), a British 3-part television programme originally broadcast in 2006
- Facing the Truth (film) (Danish: At kende sandheden), a 2002 Danish drama film
