= Angelo Fusco =

Provisional Irish Republican Army member

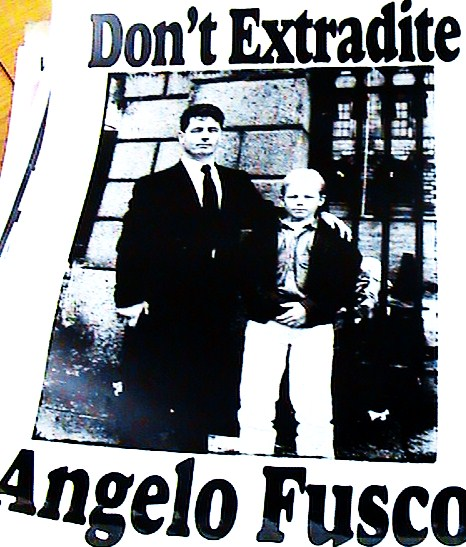
- A poster in opposition to the extradition of Angelo Fusco
- Born: 2 September 1956 (age 70); Belfast, Northern Ireland
- Military career
- Paramilitary: Provisional IRA
- Rank: Volunteer
- Unit: Belfast Brigade
- Known for: Killing of Captain Herbert Westmacott and challenging his extradition
- Conflicts: The Troubles

Angelo Fusco (born 2 September 1956) is a former volunteer in the Belfast Brigade of the Provisional Irish Republican Army (IRA) who escaped during his 1981 trial for killing Grenadier Guards officer Herbert Westmacott in 1980.

== Background and IRA activity ==
Fusco was born in west Belfast in 1956, to a family with an Italian background who owned a fish and chip shop. He joined the Belfast Brigade of the IRA and was part of a four-man active service unit, along with Joe Doherty and Paul Magee, which operated in the late 1970s and early 1980s nicknamed the "M60 gang" due to their use of an M60 machine gun. On 9 April 1980 the unit lured the Royal Ulster Constabulary (RUC) into an ambush on Stewartstown Road, killing one constable and wounding two others. On 2 May the unit were planning another attack and had taken over a house on Antrim Road, when an eight-man patrol from the SAS arrived in plain clothes, after being alerted by the RUC. A car carrying three SAS members went to the rear of the house, and another car carrying five SAS members arrived at the front of the house. As the SAS members at the front of the house exited the car the IRA unit opened fire with the M60 machine gun from an upstairs window, hitting Captain Herbert Westmacott in the head and shoulder. Westmacott was killed instantly, and is the highest-ranking member of the SAS killed in Northern Ireland. The remaining SAS members, armed with Colt Commando automatic rifles, submachine guns and Browning pistols, returned fire but were forced to withdraw. Magee was apprehended by the SAS members at the rear of the house while attempting to prepare the IRA unit's escape in a transit van, while the other three IRA members remained inside the house. More members of the security forces were deployed to the scene, and after a brief siege the remaining members of the IRA unit surrendered.

== Trial and escape ==
The trial of Fusco and the other members of the M60 gang began in early May 1981, with them facing charges including three counts of murder. On 10 June Fusco and seven other prisoners, including Joe Doherty and the other members of the IRA unit, took a prison officer hostage at gunpoint in Crumlin Road Jail. After locking the officer in a cell, the eight took other officers and visiting solicitors hostage, also locking them in cells after taking their clothing. Two of the eight wore officer's uniforms while a third wore clothing taken from a solicitor, and the group moved towards the first of three gates separating them from the outside world. They took the officer on duty at the gate hostage at gunpoint, and forced him to open the inner gate. An officer at the second gate recognised one of the prisoners and ran into an office and pressed an alarm button, and the prisoners ran through the second gate towards the outer gate. An officer at the outer gate tried to prevent the escape but was attacked by the prisoners, who escaped onto Crumlin Road. As the prisoners were moving towards the car park where two cars were waiting, an unmarked RUC car pulled up across the street outside Crumlin Road Courthouse. The RUC officers opened fire, and the prisoners returned fire before escaping in the waiting cars. Two days after the escape, Fusco was convicted in absentia and sentenced to life imprisonment with a minimum recommended term of thirty years.

== Imprisonment and extradition battle ==
Fusco escaped across the border into the Republic of Ireland before being arrested in January 1982, and was sentenced to ten years imprisonment for the escape and firearms offences under extra-jurisdictional legislation. A further three years were added to his sentence in 1986 after he attempted to escape from Portlaoise Prison, and he was released in January 1992. Upon his release, he was immediately served with extradition papers from the British government for his return to the Maze Prison in Northern Ireland to serve his sentence for the murder conviction. The extradition was granted by a District Court but Fusco appealed, and in 1995 he won a legal victory when a judge at the High Court in Dublin ruled it would be "unjust, oppressive and invidious" to order his extradition due to the time lag involved. Fusco settled in Tralee with his wife and three children until February 1998, when the Supreme Court of Ireland brought an end to the six-year legal battle by ordering his extradition, but Fusco had already fled on bail and a warrant was issued for his arrest.

Fusco was arrested at a Garda checkpoint in Castleisland, County Kerry on 3 January 2000. The following day he was being escorted back to Northern Ireland to be handed over to the RUC, when his handover was halted by a successful court appeal by Sinn Féin. The arrest and abortive return of Fusco undermined the Northern Ireland peace process, with Unionist politicians including Ken Maginnis criticising the extradition being halted. Republicans were critical of Fusco's arrest, with leading Sinn Féin member Martin Ferris stating "The Irish government should immediately move to rescind the warrant against Angelo Fusco. The action will cause great anger and resentment within the nationalist community", and graffiti in one republican area read "Extradite Bloody Sunday war criminals, not Fusco". On 6 January Fusco was refused bail and remanded to prison in Castlerea, County Roscommon to await a legal review of his extradition, prompting scuffles outside the court between police and Sinn Féin supporters.

Fusco was freed on bail on 21 March pending the outcome of his legal challenge, and in November 2000 the Irish government informed the High Court that it was no longer seeking to return him to Northern Ireland. This followed a statement from Secretary of State for Northern Ireland Peter Mandelson saying that "it is clearly anomalous to pursue the extradition of people who appear to qualify for early release under the Good Friday Agreement scheme, and who would, on making a successful application to the Sentence Review Commissioners, have little if any of their original prison sentence to serve". After the court hearing Fusco stated "I'm relieved it's over", and that he would continue to live in Tralee with his family and work for Sinn Féin. In December 2000 Fusco and three other IRA members, including two other members of the M60 gang, were granted a Royal Prerogative of Mercy which allowed them to return to Northern Ireland without fear of prosecution.
