= Thomas Peckham Phipps =

High Sheriff of Sussex

Thomas Peckham Phipps (1750-1820) was an English landowner who served as Sheriff of Sussex in 1814.

Baptised at the church of St Andrew Holborn in Middlesex on 15 April 1750, he was the eldest surviving son of Thomas Phipps (1707-1776), a Wiltshire landowner, and his wife Sarah Peckham (1718-1793), heiress to a Sussex estate at Compton. In 1734 her brother Richard Peckham had died a minor and she inherited the estate. She survived her husband, dying in 1793, when their eldest son Thomas Phipps succeeded and assumed the name of Thomas Peckham Phipps. He sold the Wiltshire lands, retaining only those in Sussex. Dying unmarried, he was buried at Up Marden in Sussex, having bequeathed the estate to his godson Admiral Sir Phipps Hornby.
