= Joe Doherty =

Irish republican army volunteer

Joe Doherty (born 20 January 1955) is an Irish former volunteer in the Belfast Brigade of the Provisional Irish Republican Army (IRA) who escaped during his 1981 trial for killing a member of the Special Air Service (SAS) in 1980. He was arrested in the United States in 1983, and became a cause célèbre while fighting an ultimately unsuccessful nine-year legal battle against extradition and deportation, with a street corner in New York City being named after him.

== Background and IRA activity ==
The son of a docker, Doherty was born on 20 January 1955 in New Lodge, Belfast. He was born into an Irish republican family, his grandfather was a member of the Irish Citizen Army which fought against British rule in the 1916 Easter Rising. Doherty left school aged 14 and began work on the docks and as an apprentice plumber, before being arrested in 1972 on his seventeenth birthday under the Special Powers Act. Doherty was interned on the prison ship HMS Maidstone and Long Kesh Detention Centre, and while interned heard of the events of Bloody Sunday in Derry, where 14 civil rights protesters were shot dead by the British Army. This led to his joining the IRA after he was released in June 1972. In the mid-1970s Doherty was convicted of possession of explosives and sentenced to six years' imprisonment in Long Kesh. He was released in December 1979.

After his release, Doherty became part of a four-man active service unit nicknamed the "M60 gang" due to their use of an M60 heavy machine gun, along with Angelo Fusco and Paul Magee. On 9 April 1980 the unit lured the Royal Ulster Constabulary (RUC) into an ambush on Stewartstown Road, killing one constable and wounding two others. On 2 May the unit were planning another attack and had taken over a house on Antrim Road, when an eight-man patrol from the SAS arrived in plain clothes, after being alerted by the RUC. A car carrying three SAS members went to the rear of the house, and another car carrying five SAS members arrived at the front of the house. As the SAS members at the front of the house exited the car, the IRA unit opened fire with the M60 machine gun from an upstairs window, hitting Captain Herbert Westmacott in the head and shoulder. Westmacott, who was killed instantly, was the highest-ranking member of the SAS killed in Northern Ireland. The remaining SAS members at the front, armed with Colt Commando automatic rifles, submachine guns and Browning pistols, returned fire but were forced to withdraw. Magee was apprehended by the SAS members at the rear of the house while attempting to prepare the IRA unit's escape in a transit van, while the other three IRA members remained inside the house. More members of the security forces were deployed to the scene, and after a brief siege the remaining members of the IRA unit surrendered.

== Trial and escape ==
The trial of Doherty and the other members of the M60 gang began in early May 1981, on charges including three counts of murder. On 10 June, Doherty and seven other prisoners, including Angelo Fusco and the other members of the IRA unit, took a prison officer hostage at gunpoint in Crumlin Road Jail. After locking the officer in a cell, the eight took other officers and visiting solicitors hostage, also locking them in cells after taking their clothing. Two of the eight wore officers' uniforms while a third wore clothing taken from a solicitor, and the group moved towards the first of three gates separating them from the outside world. They took the officer on duty at the gate hostage at gunpoint, and forced him to open the inner gate. An officer at the second gate recognised one of the prisoners and ran into an office and pressed an alarm button, and the prisoners ran through the second gate towards the outer gate. An officer at the outer gate tried to prevent the escape but was attacked by the prisoners, who escaped onto Crumlin Road. As the prisoners were moving towards the car park where two cars were waiting, an unmarked RUC car pulled up across the street outside Crumlin Road Courthouse. The RUC officers opened fire, and the prisoners returned fire before escaping in the waiting cars. Two days after the escape, Doherty was convicted in absentia and sentenced to life imprisonment with a minimum recommended term of 30 years.

== Extradition and deportation battle ==
=== Extradition hearing ===
Doherty escaped across the border into the Republic of Ireland, and then travelled to the United States on a false passport. He lived with an American girlfriend in Brooklyn and New Jersey, working on construction sites and as a bartender at Clancy's Bar in Manhattan, where he was arrested by the FBI on 28 June 1983. Doherty was imprisoned in the Metropolitan Correctional Center in Manhattan, and a legal battle ensued with the British government seeking to extradite him back to Northern Ireland. Doherty claimed he was immune from extradition as the killing of Westmacott was a political act, saying "It was an operation that was typical of all operations where we set up an ambush of a British military convoy... It is a war, and this was a military action". He cited Article 5(1)(c)(i) of the 1972 U.S.-UK Extradition Treaty, which provided that: "Extradition shall not be granted if ... the offense for which extradition is requested is regarded by the requested Party as one of a political character".

In December 1984, United States district judge John E. Sprizzo ruled that under the existing treaty, Doherty could not be extradited as the killing of a British soldier engaged in active combat was a "political offense" and his actions did not involve violence against civilians, including government representatives. In his finding, Sprizzo wrote the political offense exception was extended to guerilla warfare in addition to "actual armed insurrections or more traditional and overt military hostilities". (Note: "The Court rejects the notion that the political offense exception is limited to actual armed insurrections or more traditional and overt military hostilities. The lessons of recent history demonstrate that political struggles have been commenced and effectively carried out by armed guerillas long before they were able to mount armies in the field. It is not for the courts, in defining the parameters of the political offense exception, to regard as dispositive factors such as the likelihood that a politically dissident group will succeed, or the ability of that group to effect changes in the government by means other than violence, although concededly such factors may at times be relevant in distinguishing between the common criminal and the political offender.") He also wrote that the IRA "has both an organization, discipline, and command structure that distinguishes it from more amorphous groups such as the Black Liberation Army or the Red Brigade." (Note: "However, the PIRA, as the evidence showed, while it may be a radical offshoot of the traditional Irish Republican Army, has both an organization, discipline, and command structure that distinguishes it from more amorphous groups such as the Black Liberation Army or the Red Brigade. Indeed, as the testimony established, its discipline and command structure operates even after its members are imprisoned and indeed, as Doherty testified, it was at the direction of the PIRA that he escaped and then came to the United States.") Sprizzo also wrote that not every act constituted political offense:

How then is the political exception doctrine to be construed and what factors should limit its scope? Not every act committed for a political purpose or during a political disturbance may or should properly be regarded as a political offense. Surely the atrocities at Dachau, Aushwitz, and other death camps would be arguably political within the meaning of that definition. The same would be true of My Lai, the Bataan death march, Lidice, the Katyn Forest Massacre, and a whole host of violations of international law that the civilized world is, has been, and should be unwilling to accept. Indeed, the Nuremberg trials would have no legitimacy or meaning if any act done for a political purpose could be properly classified as a political offense. Moreover, it would not be consistent with the policy of this nation as reflected by its participation in those trials, for an American court to shield from extradition a person charged with such crimes.

The Court concludes therefore that a proper construction of the Treaty in accordance with the law and policy of this nation, requires that no act be regarded as political where the nature of the act is such as to be violative of international law, and inconsistent with international standards of civilized conduct. Surely an act which would be properly punishable even in the context of a declared war or in the heat of open military conflict cannot and should not receive recognition under the political exception to the Treaty.

Sprizzo also elaborated in regards to Doherty's actions:

Considering the offenses for which extradition is sought in the light of these precepts, the Court is constrained to conclude that the political offense exception clearly encompasses those offenses. We are not faced here with a situation in which a bomb was detonated in a department store, public tavern, or a resort hotel, causing indiscriminate personal injury, death, and property damage. Such conduct would clearly be well beyond the parameters of what and should properly be regarded as encompassed by the political offense exception to the Treaty. Whatever the precise contours of that elusive concept may be, it was in its inception an outgrowth of the notion that a person should not be persecuted for political beliefs and was not designed to protect a person from the consequences of acts that transcend the limits of international law. Nor is this a case where violence was directed against civilian representatives of the government, where defining the limits of the political offense exception would be far less clear. Similarly, this is not a case where the alleged political conduct was committed in a place other than the territory where political change was to be effected, a circumstance that would in all probability render the political offense exception inapplicable. Finally, the Court is not presented with facts which establish that hostages were killed or injured or where the principles embodied in the Geneva Convention have clearly been violated.

Finally, he wrote "the facts of this case present the assertion of the political offense exception in its most classic form. The death of Captain Westmacott, while a most tragic event, occurred in the context of an attempted ambush of a British army patrol" in Northern Ireland, an active war zone.

Sprizzo's quote regarding the attacks against civilians being excluded from political offenses was based on the 1981 court case approving the extradition to Israel of Palestinian fugitive Ziad Abu Eain who was involved in the bombing that killed two young boys and injured more than 36 civilians in Tiberias, Israel on 14 May 1979. In this case, the United States Court of Appeals for the Seventh Circuit denied Abu Eain's political offense exception on the grounds that the "indiscriminate bombing of a civilian populace is not recognized as a protected political act".

==== Reactions ====
British Conservative MP Jill Knight called the ruling "a seal of approval to murder, maiming and terrorism". Assistant Attorney General Stephen S. Trott of the U.S. Justice Department Criminal Division said he was "outraged" because it made the United States legal system complicit in terrorism. The administration of U.S. President Ronald Reagan called Sprizzo's finding "fundamentally flawed" because in it "murder and assault are effectively sanctioned as a form of political activity in a democracy."

Most major U.S. newspaper editorials responded to Sprizzo's decision with sensationalist attacks. For example, the Wall Street Journal said the political offense exception would be used to protect Pope John Paul II's attempted assassin Mehmet Ali Ağca, "whose attempted assassination of the Pope has behind it the organization, discipline and command structure of the Soviet Government." The New York Post stated the ruling would make killing a Supreme Court justice a political offense. The Chicago Tribune accused Sprizzo of misusing the power to forbid extradition. The New York Daily News asserted "Sprizzo would presumably call [the bombings of the Brighton hotel and department stores and restaurants] 'political' acts ... It's a ridiculous argument."

Belfast author Jack Holland noted the decision "had come at the time when the [Reagan] administration was trying to present a united front against 'international terrorism' and the idea that a U.S. judicial officer....should distinguish between some politically motivated violent acts and others was obviously outrageous." He wrote:

What was conveniently ignored, in the torrents of near-hysteria abuse directed at the judge, was the careful and conservative nature of his decision. It represented a limiting of the scope of the political-offense exception to actually exclude most of the kinds of crimes that the Reagan government and the popular press were accusing it of glorifying or excusing. The angry reaction had another aspect. In [the] future, any judge or magistrate contemplating finding in favor of the political-exception defense could not help being intimidated by the prospect of the denunciations and controversy that the finding would be bound to produce.

Arguing against Doherty's extradition in a New York Times editorial opinion on 19 February 1992, Professor Christopher Pyle stated:

Mr. Doherty was not extraditable for the same reason that Britain would not surrender Confederate soldiers who fled to Canada during our Civil War [e.g., St. Albans Raid]. He was a rebel, and he had not committed any atrocities.

Sprizzo's ruling led to the U.S. and UK amending their 1972 extradition treaty in 1986 and narrowed the number of political offense exceptions by specifically excluding crimes such as murder, manslaughter, and using explosives. Under Article 3 of this new treaty, fugitives can only have their extradition blocked if the requesting party can be proved that it would punish them based on their race, religion, nationality or political opinions.

=== Deportation ===
Doherty's legal battle continued as the United States Department of Justice then attempted to deport him for entering the country illegally. He remained in custody at the Metropolitan Correctional Center and attempted to claim political asylum, and on 15 June 1988 the Attorney General Edwin Meese overturned an earlier ruling by the Federal Board of Immigration Appeals that Doherty could be deported to the Republic of Ireland, and ordered his deportation to Northern Ireland. In February 1989 new Attorney General Dick Thornburgh chose not to support the decision made by his predecessor, and asked lawyers for Doherty and the Immigration and Naturalization Service to submit arguments for a review of the decision and Doherty's claim for asylum. By this time Doherty's case was a cause célèbre with his sympathisers including over 130 Congressmen and a son of then President of the United States George H. W. Bush, and in 1990 a street corner near the Metropolitan Correctional Center was named after him.

In August 1991, Doherty was transferred to a federal prison in Lewisburg, Pennsylvania, and on 16 January 1992 the Supreme Court of the United States overturned a 1990 federal appeals court ruling by a 5-to-3 decision, paving the way for his deportation. On 19 February 1992 Doherty was deported to Northern Ireland, despite pleas to delay the deportation from members of Congress, Mayor of New York City David Dinkins, and the Cardinal Archbishop of New York, John Joseph O'Connor. Doherty was returned to Crumlin Road prison before being transferred to HM Prison Maze, and was released from prison on 6 November 1998 under the terms of the Good Friday Agreement. After his release Doherty became a community worker specialising in helping disadvantaged young people. In 2006, he appeared in the BBC television show Facing the Truth opposite the relatives of a soldier killed in the Warrenpoint ambush.
