= Paul Magee =

Provisional Irish Republican Army member

Paul "Dingus" Magee (born 30 January 1948) is a former volunteer in the Belfast Brigade of the Provisional Irish Republican Army (IRA) who escaped during his 1981 trial for killing a member of the Special Air Service (SAS) in 1980. After serving a prison sentence in the Republic of Ireland, Magee fled to England where he was imprisoned after killing a policeman in 1992. He was repatriated to the Republic of Ireland as part of the Northern Ireland peace process before being released from prison in 1999, and subsequently avoided extradition back to Northern Ireland to serve his sentence for killing the member of the SAS.

== Background and early IRA activity ==
Magee was born in the Ballymurphy area of Belfast on 30 January 1948. He joined the Belfast Brigade of the IRA, and received a five-year sentence in 1971 for possession of firearms. He was imprisoned in Long Kesh, where he held the position of camp adjutant. In the late 1970s and early 1980s he was part of a four-man active service unit, along with Joe Doherty and Angelo Fusco, nicknamed the "M60 gang" due to their use of an M60 general purpose machine gun. On 9 April 1980 the unit lured the Royal Ulster Constabulary (RUC) into an ambush on Stewartstown Road, killing Constable Stephen Magill and wounding two others. On 2 May the unit were planning another attack and had taken over a house on Antrim Road, when an eight-man patrol from the British Army's Special Air Service arrived in plain clothes, after being alerted by the RUC. A car carrying three SAS members went to the rear of the house, and another car carrying five SAS members arrived at the front of the house. As the SAS members at the front of the house exited the car the IRA unit opened fire with the M60 machine gun from an upstairs window, hitting Captain Herbert Westmacott in the head and shoulder. Westmacott was killed instantly, and is the highest-ranking member of the SAS killed in Northern Ireland. The remaining SAS members at the front of the house, armed with Colt Commando automatic rifles, submachine guns and Browning pistols, returned fire but were forced to withdraw. Magee was apprehended by the SAS members at the rear of the house while attempting to prepare the IRA unit's escape in a transit van, while the other three IRA members remained inside the house. More members of the security forces were deployed to the scene, and after a brief siege the remaining members of the IRA unit surrendered.

== 1981 trial and escape ==
The trial of Magee and the other members of the M60 gang began in early May 1981, with them facing charges including three counts of murder. On 10 June Magee and seven other prisoners, including Joe Doherty, Angelo Fusco and the other member of the IRA unit, took a prison officer hostage at gunpoint in Crumlin Road Jail. After locking the officer in a cell, the eight took other officers and visiting solicitors hostage, also locking them in cells after taking their clothing. Two of the eight wore officer's uniforms while a third wore clothing taken from a solicitor, and the group moved towards the first of three gates separating them from the outside world. They took the officer on duty at the gate hostage at gunpoint, and forced him to open the inner gate. An officer at the second gate recognised one of the prisoners and ran into an office and pressed an alarm button, and the prisoners ran through the second gate towards the outer gate. An officer at the outer gate tried to prevent the escape but was attacked by the prisoners, who escaped onto Crumlin Road. As the prisoners were moving towards the car park where two cars were waiting, an unmarked RUC car pulled up across the street outside Crumlin Road Courthouse. The RUC officers opened fire, and the prisoners returned fire before escaping in the waiting cars. Two days after the escape, Magee was convicted in absentia and sentenced to life imprisonment with a minimum recommended term of thirty years.

== Imprisonment in the Republic of Ireland ==
Magee escaped across the border into the Republic of Ireland. Eleven days after the escape he appeared in public at the Wolfe Tone commemoration in Bodenstown, County Kildare, where troops from the Irish Army and the Garda's Special Branch attempted to arrest him, but failed after the crowd threw missiles and lay down in the road blocking access. He was arrested in January 1982 along with Angelo Fusco, and sentenced to ten years imprisonment for the escape under extra-jurisdictional legislation. Shortly before his release from prison in 1989 Magee was served with an extradition warrant, and he started a legal battle to avoid being returned to Northern Ireland. In October 1991 the Supreme Court in Dublin ordered his return to Northern Ireland to serve his sentence for the murder of Captain Westmacott, but Magee had jumped bail and a warrant was issued for his arrest.

== IRA activity in England ==
Magee fled to England, where he was part of an IRA active service unit. On 7 June 1992 Magee and another IRA member, Michael O'Brien, were travelling in a car on the A64 road between York and Tadcaster, when they were stopped by the police. Magee and O'Brien were questioned by the unarmed police officers, who became suspicious and called for back-up. Magee shot Special Constable Glenn Goodman - who died later in hospital - and then shot the other officer, PC Kelly, four times. PC Kelly escaped death when a fifth bullet ricocheted off the radio he was holding to his ear, and the IRA members drove away. Another police car began to follow the pair, and came under fire near Burton Salmon. The lives of the officers in the car were in danger, but Magee and O'Brien fled the scene after a member of the public arrived. A manhunt was launched, and hundreds of police officers, many of them armed, searched woods and farmland. Magee and O'Brien evaded capture for four days by hiding in a culvert, before they were both arrested in separate police operations in the town of Pontefract.

== Imprisonment in England ==
On 31 March 1993 Magee was found guilty of the murder of Special Constable Goodman and the attempted murder of three other police officers, and sentenced to life imprisonment. O'Brien was found guilty of attempted murder and received an eighteen-year sentence. On 9 September 1994 Magee and five other prisoners, including Danny McNamee, escaped from HM Prison Whitemoor. The prisoners, in possession of two guns that had been smuggled into the prison, scaled the prison walls using knotted sheets. A guard was shot and wounded during the escape, and the prisoners were captured after being chased across fields by guards and the police. In 1996 Magee staged a dirty protest in HM Prison Belmarsh, in protest at glass screens separating prisoners from their relatives during visits. Magee had refused to accept visits from his wife and five children for two years, prompting Sinn Féin to accuse the British government of maintaining "a worsening regime that is damaging physically and psychologically".

In January 1997 Magee and the other five escapees from Whitemoor were on trial on charges relating to the escape for a second time, four months earlier the first trial had been stopped because of prejudicial publicity. Lawyers for the defendants successfully argued that an article in the Evening Standard prejudiced the trial as it contained photographs of Magee and two other defendants and described them as "terrorists", as an order had been made at the start of the trial preventing any reference to the background and previous convictions of the defendants. Despite the judge saying the evidence against the defendants was "very strong", he dismissed the case stating: "What I have done is the only thing I can do in the circumstances. The law for these defendants is the same law for everyone else. They are entitled to that, whatever they have done".

== Extradition battle ==
On 5 May 1998 Magee was repatriated to the Republic of Ireland to serve the remainder of his sentence in Portlaoise Prison, along with Liam Quinn and the members of the Balcombe Street Gang. He was released from prison in late 1999 under the terms of the Good Friday Agreement, and returned to live with his family in Tralee. On 8 March 2000 Magee was arrested on the outstanding Supreme Court extradition warrant from 1991, and remanded to Mountjoy Prison. The following day he was granted bail at the High Court in Dublin, after launching a legal challenge to his extradition. In November 2000 the Irish government informed the High Court that it was no longer seeking to return him to Northern Ireland. This followed a statement from Secretary of State for Northern Ireland Peter Mandelson saying that "it is clearly anomalous to pursue the extradition of people who appear to qualify for early release under the Good Friday Agreement scheme, and who would, on making a successful application to the Sentence Review Commissioners, have little if any of their original prison sentence to serve". In December 2000 Magee and three other IRA members, including two other members of the M60 gang, were granted a Royal Prerogative of Mercy which allowed them to return to Northern Ireland without fear of prosecution.
