= Herbert Westmacott =

British Army officer and first posthumous recipient of the Military Cross

- Born: Herbert Richard Westmacott; 11 January 1952; Chichester, West Sussex, England
- Died: 2 May 1980 (aged 28); Belfast, Northern Ireland
- Burial place: St Michael's Church, Up Marden, West Sussex, England
- Relatives: Peter Westmacott (cousin)
- Military career
- Allegiance: United Kingdom
- Branch: British Army
- Rank: Captain
- Service number: 491354
- Units: Grenadier Guards; Special Air Service
- Conflicts: Operation Banner †
- Awards: Military Cross

Captain Herbert Richard Westmacott MC (11 January 1952 – 2 May 1980) was a British Army officer who became the first person to be awarded a posthumous Military Cross. As an officer of the Grenadier Guards (2nd Battalion) on extra regimental employment to the Special Air Service (SAS), he died in an encounter with the Provisional Irish Republican Army.

He was in command of an eight-man plainclothes SAS patrol that had been alerted by the Royal Ulster Constabulary that IRA gunmen had taken over a house on Antrim Road, Belfast. A car carrying three SAS men went to the rear of the house, and another car carrying five SAS men went to the front of the house. As the SAS arrived at the front of the house the IRA unit, nicknamed the "M60 gang", opened fire from a window with an M60 machine gun, hitting Westmacott in the head and shoulder and killing him instantly. The remaining SAS men at the front returned fire but were forced to withdraw. One member of the IRA team was apprehended by the SAS at the rear of the house while preparing the unit's escape in a transit van. The other three IRA members remained inside the house. More members of the security forces were deployed to the scene, and after a brief siege the remaining members of the IRA unit surrendered.

Westmacott was posthumously awarded the Military Cross for gallantry in Northern Ireland during the period 1 February to 30 April 1980. He is buried in the churchyard of St Michael's, Up Marden, West Sussex.

His cousin is Peter Westmacott, a British ambassador who facilitated the first meeting between Gerry Adams and Patrick Mayhew.

Several men, including Angelo Fusco, Paul Magee and Joe Doherty, were convicted in absentia of murder in June 1981 by the Northern Ireland authorities after they escaped from custody.
