= Up Marden =

Village and parish in West Sussex, England

Coordinates: 50.92121°N 0.86824°W

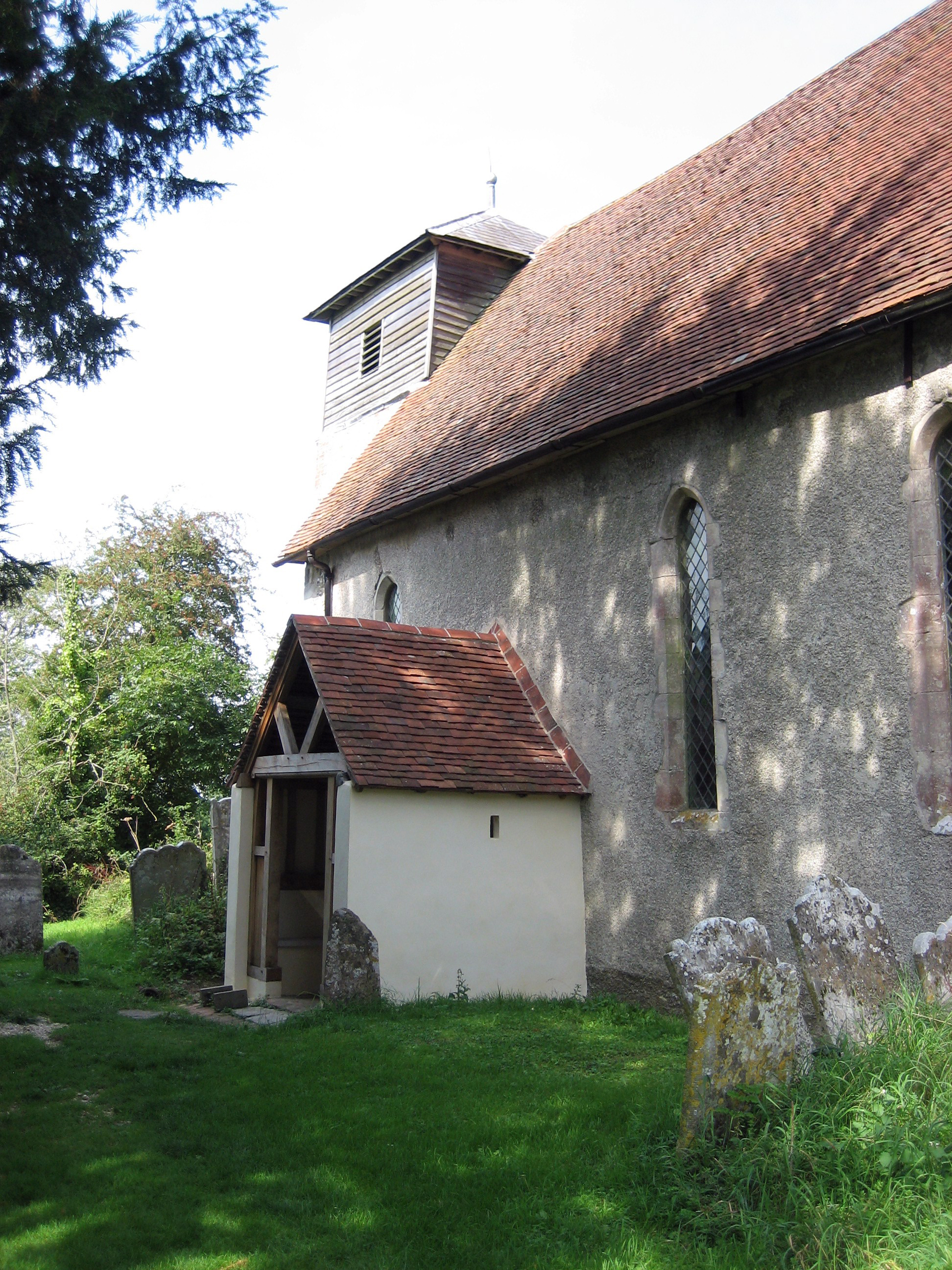
- Church of St. Michael

- Location within West Sussex
- OS grid reference: SU796141
  - London: 52 miles (84 km) NE
- Civil parish: Compton
- District: Chichester
- Shire county: West Sussex
- Region: South East
- Country: England
- Sovereign state: United Kingdom
- Post town: Chichester
- Postcode district: PO18
- Dialling code: 023
- Police: Sussex
- Fire: West Sussex
- Ambulance: South East Coast
- UK Parliament: Chichester

Up Marden is a small village and former civil parish, now in the parish of Compton, in the Chichester district of West Sussex, England. It is on the South Downs 7 miles (11 km) north-west of Chichester, close to East Marden and North Marden. In 1931 the parish had a population of 266.

There are neolithic and Roman sites in the area. Recorded history of the settlement starts in the 10th century and a church was in existence by 1121. The present church building is of Norman style construction and the church has remained almost unchanged. It has been described as having one of the loveliest interiors in England. The landscape, which is protected within the South Downs National Park, is based on chalk rock strata formed in the Late Cretaceous.

== History ==
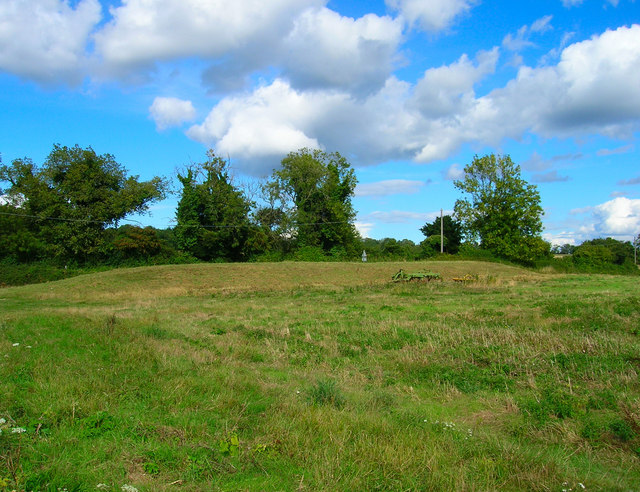
Bevis's Thumb is a Neolithic long barrow

A Neolithic long barrow on Fernbeds Down at the north of Up Marden is named Baverse's Thumb or alternatively Solomon's Thumb, probably as a mediaeval means of Christianising a pagan neolithic monument. Remains of Roman villas at Pitlands Farm in Up Marden and at Watergate Hanger in nearby West Marden indicate that there were Roman estates in the area.

Prior to the Norman Conquest a thegn called Goda is recorded as giving four cassati of land to his son-in-law Wiohstan. Wiohstan bought a further manentern near "the pool called Blackmere" from Ealfred and his wife Ealsware, then sold five hides to Bishop Wulfhun of Selsey for 2,000 silver pennies and a horse in around 935. Wiohstan, with his wife and son, was going to Rome. During the reign of Edward the Confessor the Mardens, then known as Meredone, were owned by Countess Gytha, wife of Earl Godwin, and held by Lefsi. By 1086 the Domesday Book shows four undifferentiated entries for the Mardens which were held by Engeler de Bohun from Roger de Montgomery.

The prefix Up in Up Marden does not occur before 1227 except in a 14th-century copy of a Saxon charter where it may have been added retrospectively. In that year Reginald Aguillon was given the manor by his mother Mary who had inherited it from her father Eustace de Valle Pironis. By 1240 this land had been divided between Aguillon's four daughters, Mary, Cicely, Godehuda and Alice. It seems that Cicely gave her part to the Knights Hospitaller; the Prior of St John of Jerusalem held a quarter share in the manor in 1428 and continuing until the Dissolution of the monasteries. The rest of the land eventually came to Alice who remarried to Robert Hacket and in 1357 the Hacket family sold their land to Richard, Earl of Arundel. This three-quarter share of Up Marden remained with the Earldom of Arundel until 1581 when it was sold to William Paye, with a windmill included. The windmill was sold to Thomas Marten and the rest became divided up. That part belonging to the Hospitallers became known as Up Marden Saint John. it was granted in 1544 to Henry Audeley and John Cordall who at once passed it on to John Sone. It was later bought by Anne Peckham in 1713, was connected with Thomas Peckham Phipps in 1793 and held by Vice Admiral Sir G. T. Phipps Hornby in 1879.

== Governance ==
In the 19th century Up Marden was recorded as a parish in the hundred of West Bourne and Singleton, in the Rape of Chichester. From 1894 to 1933 it was part of Westbourne Rural District and was then incorporated into Compton by the West Sussex Review Order of 1933. On 1 April 1933 the parish was abolished and merged with Compton.

== Geography and landscape ==
Up Marden lies on the chalk escarpment of the South Downs at an elevation from about 75 metres (250 feet) to 150 metres (490 feet). The hills are part of the Southern England Chalk Formation of rocks laid down during the Late Cretaceous period around 66 to 90 million years ago. Soils are of the Andover 1 association consisting of shallow silty calcareous well drained soils which overlie chalk on the slopes and ridges of the hills. Deeper calcareous or non-calcareous fine silty soils occur in the dry valleys. These soils which dry out quickly after rain are suited to cereal production, grassland and beech woodland. Plants are able to root deeply and extract water from the underlying chalk during dry summers.

The area is protected as part of the South Downs National Park. Notable protected species of birds include Peregrine, Merlin, Fieldfare, Redwing, Woodlark and Brambling.

== Area and population ==
The parish, with an area of 3,170 acres, had sixty houses in 1851. The population was recorded as 46 families in 1724 and 255 people in 1801. It had grown to 364 by 1831.

== Church ==
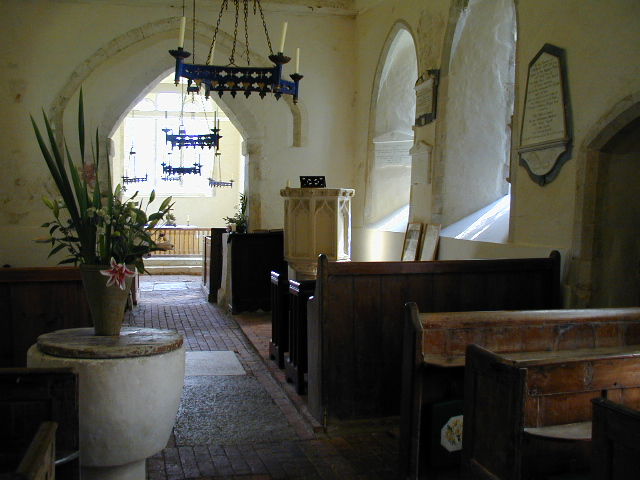
The interior of St Michael's showing the ancient font and the repaired chancel arch

No church was mentioned at Marden in the Domesday Survey, only those at Compton and Stoughton. Before 1121 however Up Marden church had been given, along with Stoughton church, to Lewes Priory by Savaric fitz-Cane. St Michael's Church stands 500 feet (150 metres) above sea level on a ridge where it is approached along a farm track. Described by Ian Nairn as having one of the loveliest interiors in England the church is all of 13th century construction. The triangular chancel arch between chancel and unaisled nave is a 16th-century repair to the original 13th-century arch. The walls and wagon roofs are plastered and the floors of brick. The windows are large simple lancets, with the east window consisting of three together under a rere-arch. The tower has a weatherboarded bell chamber. The chancel contains a trefoil headed piscina. A more recent feature for such an ancient church is the Victorian stone pulpit with ogee-panelled sides which, in Nairn's opinion, fits in perfectly. In 1628 a bell was cast for the church by bell founders Thomas Wakefield and Bryan Eldridge. There were also two other bells, one dated 1620 and one unmarked, but all three have been taken down because of weakness in the bell tower.

Captain Herbert Westmacott, MC (1952–1980), a British Army officer who became the first person to be awarded a posthumous Military Cross, is buried in the churchyard.

In a topographical dictionary of 1833 the living at Up Marden church is shown as a curacy subordinate to the vicarage of Compton.

== Education ==
Reverend Dr. Cox, a rector of Compton and Up Marden who died in 1741, left £100 for the education of poor children in the parishes. This was vested in George Farrell and yielded £3 10s annually for the purpose. In 1769 an endowed school with six children of poor families was in being.
