= West Marden =

Hamlet in West Sussex, England

Coordinates: 50.91702°N 0.90202°W

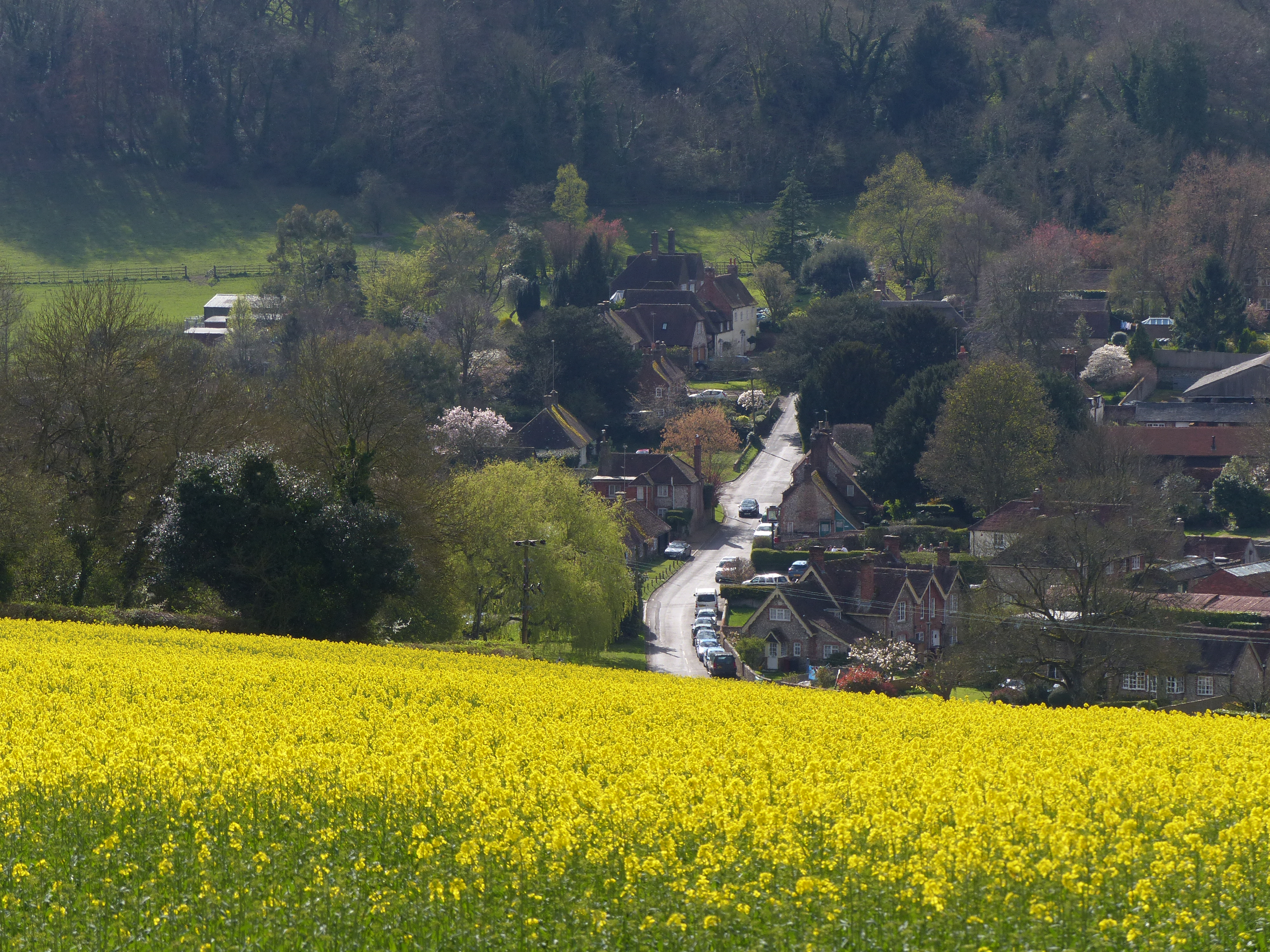
- West Marden

- Location within West Sussex
- OS grid reference: SU772136
- Civil parish: Compton
- District: Chichester
- Shire county: West Sussex
- Region: South East
- Country: England
- Sovereign state: United Kingdom
- Post town: Chichester
- Postcode district: PO18
- Police: Sussex
- Fire: West Sussex
- Ambulance: South East Coast
- UK Parliament: Chichester

West Marden is a hamlet in the Chichester district of West Sussex, England. Situated in a small valley, it lies on the B2146 road 5 miles (8.2 km) north of Emsworth. It is in the civil parish of Compton.
