= Colt 933 =

Colt Model 933, 5.56 mm
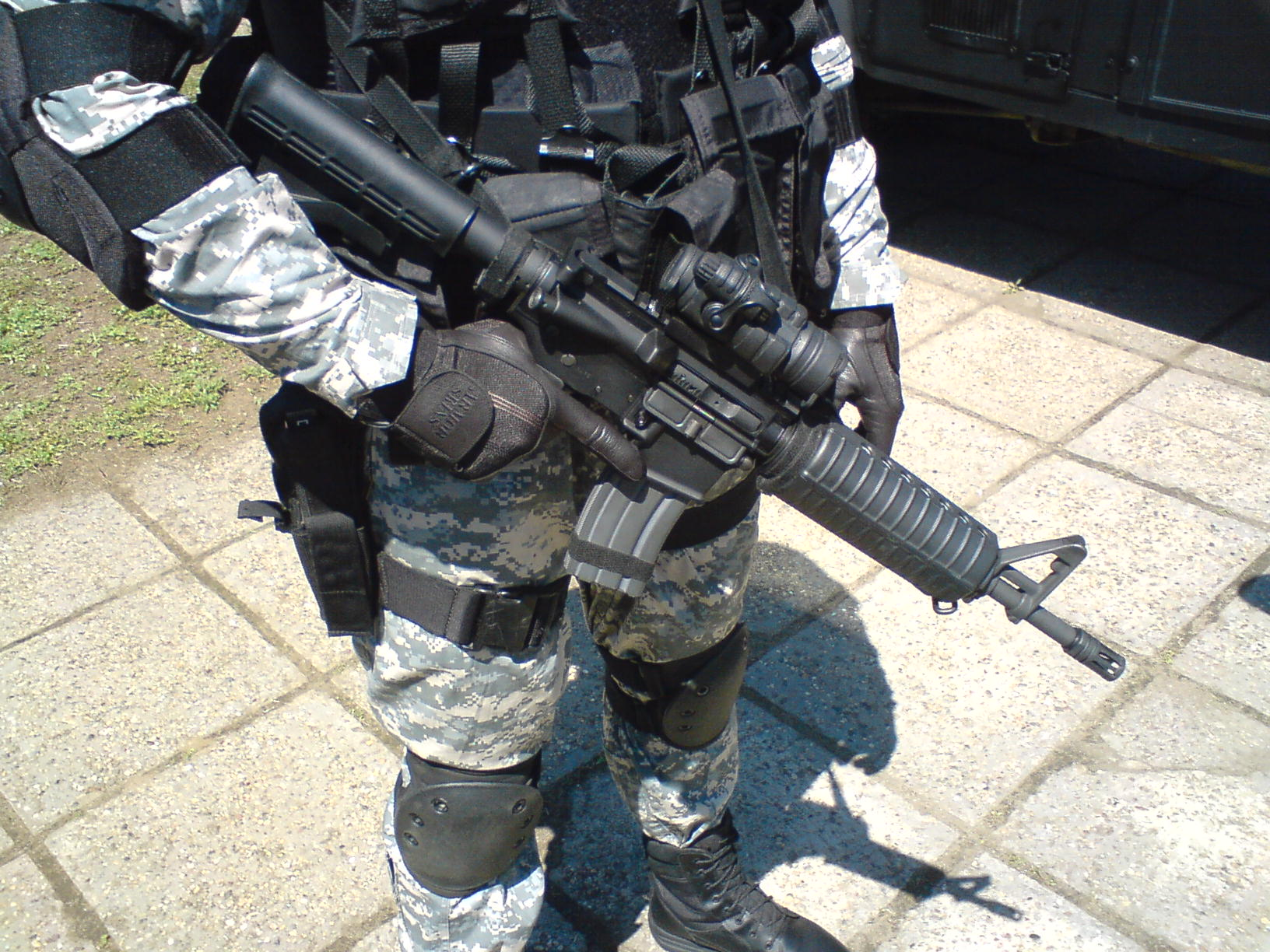
- Colt 933 Commando
- Type: Assault rifle, Carbine
- Place of origin: United States

Service history
- In service: 1995 - present
- Used by: See Users
- Wars: Insurgency in Jammu and Kashmir; War on terror

Production history
- Manufacturer: Colt Defense
- Produced: 1995–present
- No. built: 1,800
- Variants: M4A1

Specifications
- Mass: 2.44 kg (5.4 lb) empty 2.64 kg (5.8 lb) with 30 rounds
- Length: 680 mm (27 in) (stock retracted); 762 mm (30.0 in) (stock extended)
- Barrel length: 292 mm (11.5 in), 254 mm (10.0 in) (standard CAR-15)
- Cartridge: 5.56×45mm (.223 Remington)
- Action: Gas-operated, rotating bolt
- Rate of fire: 700–950 round/min cyclic
- Feed system: 30-round box magazine or other STANAG Magazines.

The Colt Model 933 is a compact carbine based on the AR-15, M16 rifle and M4 Carbine produced by Colt starting in 1995. Due to its compact size, the short-barreled Colt 933 continues to be used by various US Special Forces and by some foreign forces, including Israeli Special Forces.

== History ==
During the Vietnam War, Colt would issue a carbine variant of the M16 known as the XM177, for close-quarters combat. These rifles would have the barrel length cut down to 10 inches (25 cm) which upset the ballistics, reduced its range and accuracy, and had considerable muzzle flash and blast. Colt would partially fix this by adding a large flash suppressor, although it did not help with the rifle's loud report. Colt would later raise the barrel length from 10 inches to 11.5 Inches in response to field testing, and the rifle would be adopted as the XM177E2, which was assigned to MACV-SOG units. This reduced the muzzle flash and blast issues that the 10-inch XM177E1 had, and would be produced until 1970.

After the Vietnam War, Colt would mainly focus its attention to carbines with 14.5-inch (370 mm) or 20-inch (510 mm) barrels, but continued to make carbines with 11.5-inch (290 mm) barrels, which they called Commandos. The first of which was the Colt Model 733 as the M16A2 Commando, which was created from whatever spare parts Colt had lying around. These became popular with police and special forces users such as Delta Force and USMC Force Recon.

In 1995, Colt would introduce the Model 933 as the M4 Commando, after the success of the M4 Carbine. These modernized Commandos have a "flattop" receiver, with a removable carry handle and a MIL-STD-1913 Picatinny rail, and semi-and-fully automatic fire capability. The parts are also interchangeable with the longer M4 Carbine. Despite suffering from some of the same issues that plagued the earlier Commando carbines, the 933 still remains popular amongst some police and special forces users. Colt would later rebrand the 933 as the M4 Commando.

== Users ==
- Afghanistan
- Israel
- Serbia: Used by Special Anti-Terrorist Unit.
- United States: Used by LAPD Metropolitan Division and USMC Force Recon.
