= Facing the Truth (TV programme) =

- Starring: Archbishop Desmond Tutu
- No. of episodes: 3

Original release
- Network: BBC Two
- Release: 4 January – 6 January 2006

Facing the Truth is a British television programme. Partly based on South Africa's Truth and Reconciliation Commission, the three part series was presented by Fergal Keane and Archbishop Desmond Tutu. In the programme victims and perpetrators of Northern Ireland's Troubles meet for the first time.

The second show featured Provisional IRA member Joe Doherty opposite the relatives of a soldier killed in the Warrenpoint ambush. In the final programme of the series Milltown Massacre gunman Michael Stone met with the relatives of Dermot Hackett, a Roman Catholic delivery man he was convicted of killing in 1987.

Despite admitting to the murder at the time, Stone stated in the programme that he was not directly responsible, having been withdrawn from the operation after planning it.
