= Compton, West Sussex =

Village and parish in West Sussex, England

Coordinates: 50.92748°N 0.89701°W

Compton
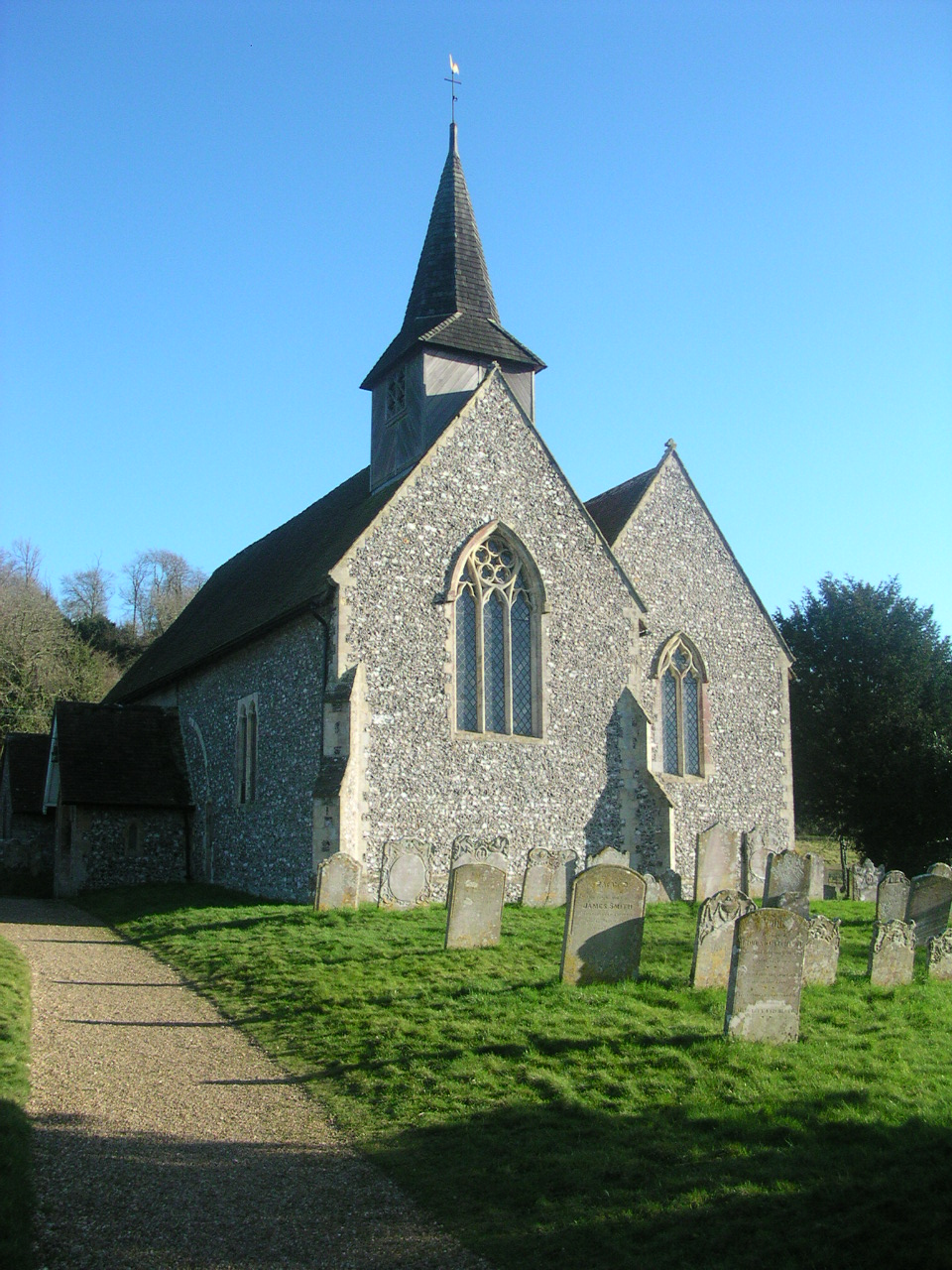
- Compton Church

- Location within West Sussex
- Area: 17.51 km^{2} (6.76 sq mi)
- Population: 463. 2011 Census
  - Density: 22/km^{2} (57/sq mi)
- OS grid reference: SU776147
  - London: 52 miles (84 km) NE
- Civil parish: Compton
- District: Chichester
- Shire county: West Sussex
- Region: South East
- Country: England
- Sovereign state: United Kingdom
- Post town: CHICHESTER
- Postcode district: PO18
- Dialling code: 023
- Police: Sussex
- Fire: West Sussex
- Ambulance: South East Coast
- UK Parliament: Chichester

Compton is a village and civil parish in the Chichester district of West Sussex. The village lies on the B2146 road, six miles (9.7 km) southeast of Petersfield, Hampshire and eight miles (13 km) northwest of Chichester. The parish also includes the villages of West Marden and Up Marden.

== History and Geography ==
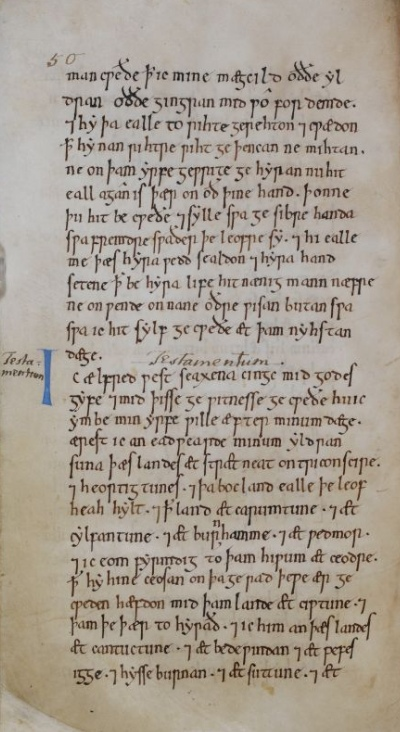
Will of Alfred the Great, AD 873–888, mentions Cumtune (11th-century copy, British Library Stowe MS 944, ff. 29v–33r)

The village has a long history, perhaps first being mentioned in the will of King Alfred the Great. It is in the Sussex Downs Area of Outstanding Natural Beauty.

High ground nearby is known as Compton Down and on a part of the down known as Telegraph Hill there was an Admiralty semaphore station.

== Parish church ==
The church of England parish church dedicated to Saint Mary the Virgin, dates from the 12th and 13th centuries, but was heavily restored in 1849. The building is flint-faced with stone dressings and a tiled roof. It has a chancel and nave with south aisle, north porch and western bell turret, which is weather boarded with a shingled spire. It is a Grade II* listed building, and currently forms part of the Octagon Parish team ministry.

== Education ==
For education, the rural village consists of an all-through primary school, Compton & Up Marden Church of England Primary School, and Littlegreen Academy, a specialist primary and secondary school predominantly aimed at supporting boys aged 7-16 with a diverse range of social, emotional and mental health needs. The school is situated north of the village and its settlement consists of a grade II listed country manor. Since January 2019, the school has been part of the Solent Academies Trust.
