= CAR-15 =

Carbine of the United States

CAR-15 XM177 Commando
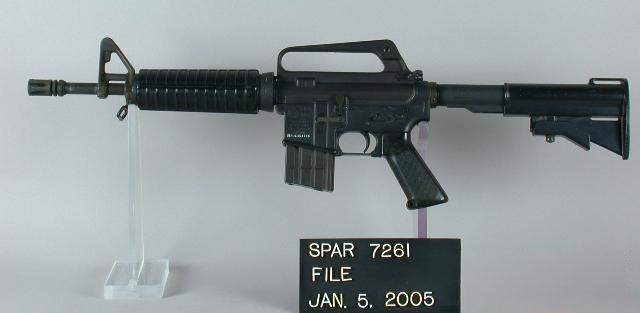
- GAU-5/A, USAF version of the XM177
- Type: Assault rifle Carbine
- Place of origin: United States

Service history
- In service: 1966–1998 (US service); 1966–present (other countries)
- Wars: Vietnam War; Laotian Civil War; Cambodian Civil War; Sino-Vietnamese War; Lebanese Civil War; Operation Eagle Claw; 1982 Lebanon war Salvadoran Civil War; Guatemalan Civil War; United States invasion of Grenada; United States invasion of Panama; Gulf War

Production history
- Manufacturer: Colt Defense
- Variants: XM177 (R610 in US Army service) XM177E1 (R609 in US Army service) XM177E2 (R629 in US Army service) GAU-5/A (R609 in US Air Force service) GAU-5A/A (R649 in US Air Force service)

Specifications
- Mass: 5.35 lb (2.43 kg)
- Length: 31 in (790 mm) (XM177E1, stock extended) 28.3 in (720 mm) (XM177E1, stock retracted); 32.5 in (830 mm) (XM177E2, stock extended) 29.8 in (760 mm) (XM177E2, stock retracted)
- Barrel length: 10 in (250 mm) (XM177E1); 11.5 in (290 mm) (XM177E2)
- Cartridge: 5.56×45mm NATO, .223 Remington
- Action: Gas-operated, closed rotating bolt, Stoner bolt and carrier piston
- Muzzle velocity: 2,650 ft/s (810 m/s) (XM177E1); 2,750 ft/s (840 m/s) (XM177E2)
- Effective firing range: 400 m (440 yd)
- Feed system: 30-round box magazine or other STANAG magazines.
- Sights: Iron sights or various optics

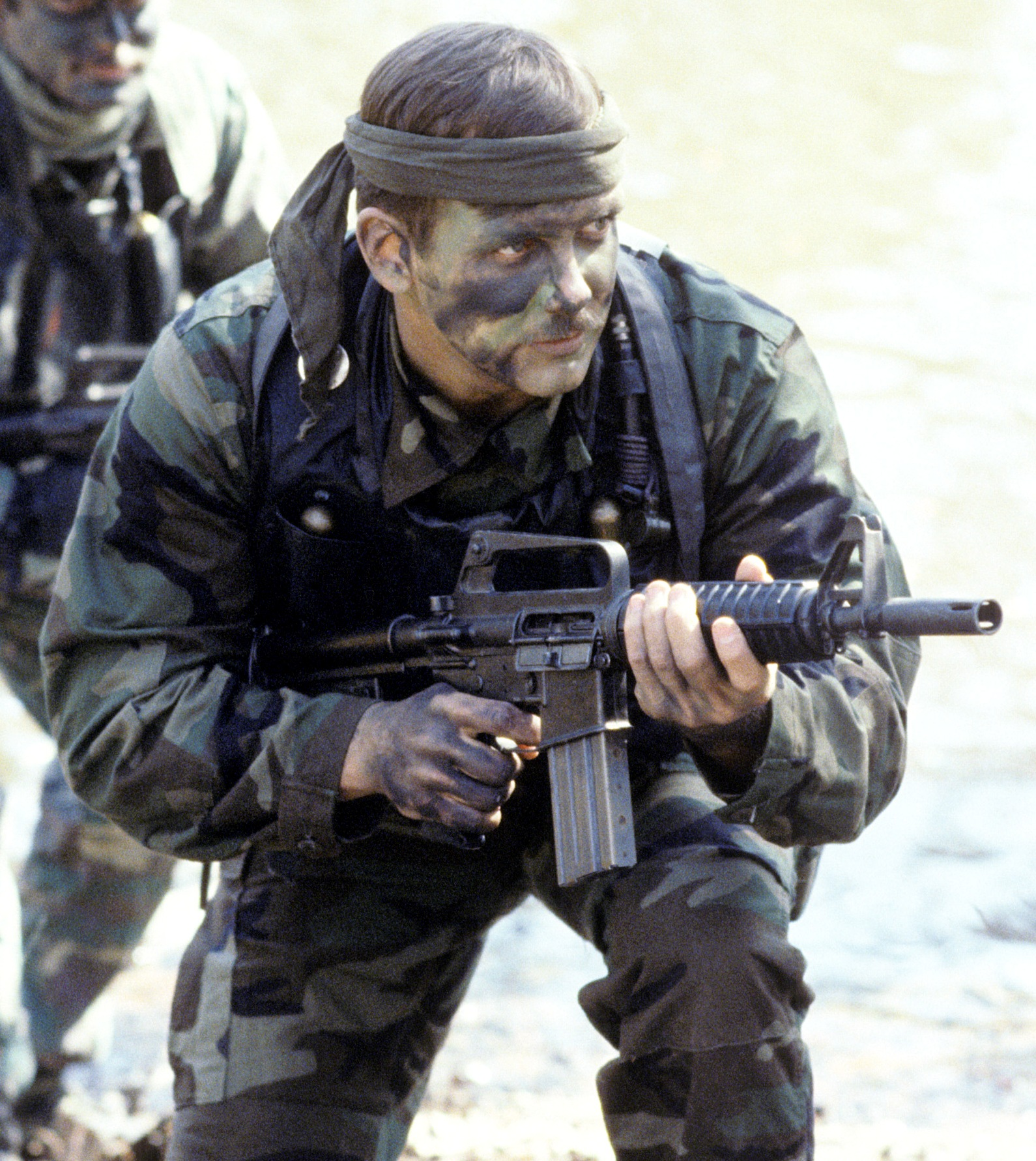
A U.S. Navy SEAL with a Colt Commando, April 1985

The CAR-15 is a family of M16 rifle–based firearms marketed by Colt in the 1960s and early 1970s. However, the term "CAR-15" is most commonly associated with the Colt Commando (a.k.a. XM177); these select-fire carbines have ultrashort 10.5-inch (270 mm) and 11.5-inch (290 mm) barrels with over-sized flash suppressors.

== Etymology ==
Different sources attribute the letters "AR" in AR-15 to different origins in the early history of the rifle by its manufacturer, ArmaLite. According to the company's website, it stood for "ArmaLite Rifle". According to Eugene Stoner's business partner, Jim Sullivan, the letters "AR" stood for the first two letters of the company's name, while according to Stoner's daughter and son-in-law it stood for "ArmaLite Research". A common misconception is that "AR" is an abbreviation for assault rifle or automatic rifle, perhaps because of the weapon's inclusion in the Federal Assault Weapons Ban in 1994, or because the ArmaLite AR-15 was originally designed to replace the M14 rifle in the Vietnam War.

The CAR-15 name was an attempt to re-associate the AR-15 name with Colt. Colt later abandoned the CAR-15 concept, but continued to make carbine variations, using the "M16" brand for select-fire models and the "Colt AR-15" brand for semi-automatic models. However, in present usage, "CAR-15" is the generic name for all carbine-length variants made before the M4 carbine.

== History ==
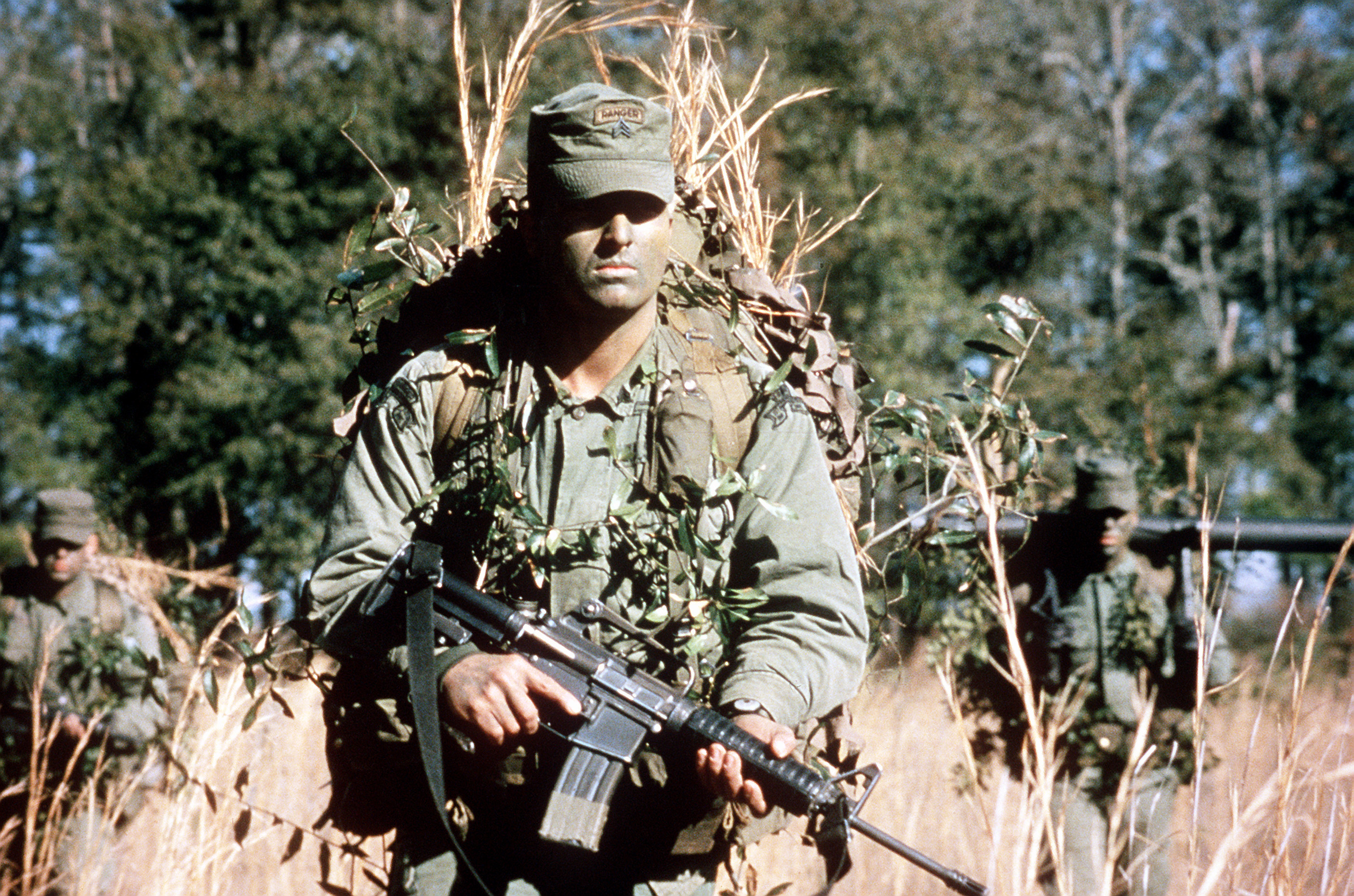
The U.S. Army Ranger in the foreground is armed with an M16A1 carbine (Model 653).

After Colt's Patent Firearms Manufacturing Company purchase of the rights and intellectual property to the AR-10 and AR-15 rifles from Armalite in late 1959, Colt embarked on a research and development program to create variations of the AR platform that evolved into the CAR-15 family of firearms. The focus of the CAR-15 R&D was to develop five different variants of the existing AR-15 in addition to a 40mm grenade launcher. The five firearms developed were a submachine gun (SMG), a carbine, a heavy barrel magazine-fed squad automatic weapon (SAW), a belt-fed machine gun, and a compact survival rifle. Only the SMG generated any interest with the U.S. Army and "Aside from limited purchases of 100-150 M-1 heavy assault rifles for trials during the upcoming SAWS program, the military was cool to most of Colt's CAR-15 Military Weapons System, and only a handful of carbines, M-2 belt-fed assault rifles and survival rifles were ever produced. However, the short-barreled submachine gun and the 40mm grenade launcher attachment did undergo considerable further development."

The CAR-15 program started in earnest in 1964 with samples of the SMG Model 607 being submitted to the U.S. Army for evaluation. Starting in May 1965, Colt attempted to market the M16 rifle and its variants developed under the CAR-15 program to commercial markets and markets outside the United States as a modular weapon system. By using various upper assemblies, buttstocks, and pistol grips, the weapon could be configured as an assault rifle, a carbine, a submachine gun, an open-bolt squad automatic weapon, a belt-fed light machine gun, or a survival rifle. There was a second belt-fed machine gun developed under the CAR-15 program called the CMG-1, CMG-2, and CMG-3 in 7.62 NATO that was not based on the existing AR-15/M16 design. However, the U.S. military only made significant purchases of the existing M16 rifle and the SMG model, later called the Commando versions, so Colt abandoned the CAR-15 family concept. The "CAR-15 Rifle" was already identified by most users as the M16 rifle, and "CAR-15" was similarly associated with the short-barreled Colt Submachine Gun and Commando models. Because of that, the term "CAR-15" has been used to describe any M16-based carbine, even if the particular weapon is not officially named this.

== Colt Automatic Rifle-15 family ==
=== CAR-15 Rifle (M16 rifle) ===
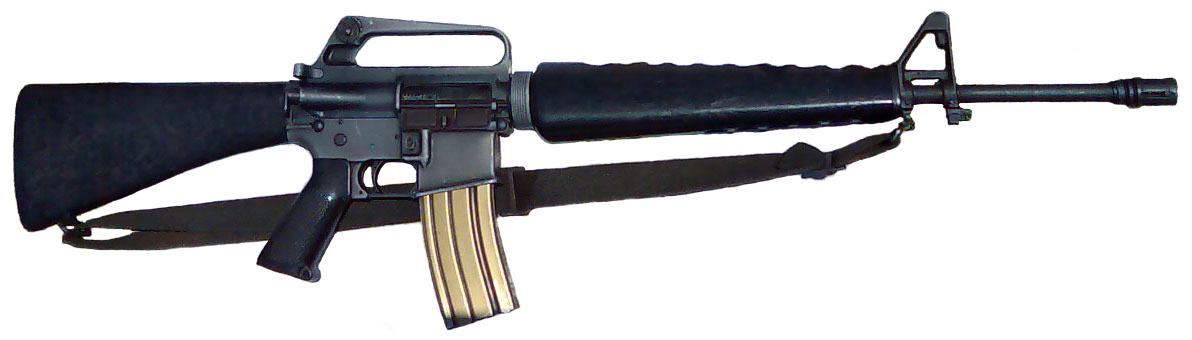
M16A1 rifle

Beginning in 1961 under ARPA's Project Agile, Colt provided approximately 1,000 AR-15s for evaluation to the U.S. Government in southeast Asia. Colt was eventually awarded their first contract to supply the U.S. Army and U.S. Air Force with the M16 in November, 1963. The Model 603 CAR-15 Rifle, adopted initially by the United States Army as the XM16E1 and then later as the M16A1, and the Model 604 CAR-15 Rifle, adopted by the United States Air Force as the M16, formed the core of the CAR-15 family. However, the United States military had already committed to purchases before Colt created the concept of the CAR-15 weapons system. The principal difference between the Model 603 and Model 604 is that the former has a forward assist, allowing a user to manually close a stuck bolt.

=== CAR-15 Heavy Assault Rifle M1 (Model 606) ===
The CAR-15 Heavy Assault Rifle M1 was a heavy-barreled version of the standard CAR-15 with a bipod attachment, intended for use as a Squad Automatic Weapon (SAW). It was designed to feed from the same detachable box magazine used for the M16. Approximately 100-150 were produced by Colt for evaluation by the U.S. Army during the SAWS program in 1965. Colt continued attempts to market the HBAR M16A1 as the Model 621 through the late 1970s without success and only a few dozen were manufactured. Colt did eventually produce a heavy barrel civilian market semi-automatic AR-15 beginning in the late 1980s based on the M16A2 called the AR-15 HBAR that was a commercial success.

=== CAR-15 Heavy Assault Rifle M2 ===
The CAR-15 Heavy Assault Rifle M2 was a belt-fed conversion of the standard CAR-15, with a heavy barrel and bipod attachment. It was made in prototype form only and saw no sales. The CAR-15 Heavy Assault Rifle M2 was not related to the CMG-1, CMG-2, or CMG-3 belt fed machine guns.

=== CAR-15 Carbine (Model 605) ===
The Model 605 CAR-15 Carbine was a shortened version of Colt's M16E1/M16A1 for situations where longer weapons could be unwieldy, such as inside armored vehicles, ships/boats, or helicopters. There were only a very small number of known prototypes of the carbine made sometime after the 1963 award of the first contract to Colt for the delivery of the M16 and M16E1. The first prototype was essentially an M16E1/M16A1 rifle with 5 inches of the barrel removed resulting is a barrel 15 inches (381 mm) in length, so that it ended just forward of the front sight base. Because of the shorter barrel and no space to attach a bayonet, the bayonet mounting lugs removed. Due to the shortened barrel with the gas port intersecting the barrel bore near the muzzle, the gas port diameter was opened up to match the internal diameter of the gas tube at 0.110 inches.

A second prototype used a custom profile 16-inch (410 mm) barrel with the gas port and front sight base/gas block moved back approximately 2.5 inches to improve reliability. A standard M16 handguard had 2.5 inches cut off the back to fit the shortened barrel/gas system, and a custom adapter fabricated to retain the modified handguard in the existing retainer ring surrounding the barrel nut. As an added benefit from the relocated front sight/gas block a bayonet was able to be fitted. This gas system is arguably the first use of what is called today as a "mid-length" gas system since it falls between the 12 in gas system of the rifle and the 7 inch gas system used in the SMG variants.

Because of the issues with reliable cycling caused by the shortened barrel, Colt experimented with buffers and low mass bolt carriers during the development of the carbine and SMG versions of the CAR-15. The only two known versions of the Model 605 prototypes used a modified lower receiver assembly that appears to use an early M16 Model 603 type forging without the "fence" surrounding the magazine release button. The modified lower receiver incorporated a four-position selector switch (developed by Foster Sturtevant in December 1966) so that a user could select safe, semi-automatic, three-round burst, or full automatic modes of fire. Unlike the standard three-position group, the four-position group went from (going clockwise from the 9 o'clock position) safe, fully automatic, semi-automatic and finally burst. The selector itself had 360 degrees of motion, and could be moved either clockwise or counterclockwise, unlike with standard groups. Instead of three-round burst, the burst cam could be modified to two-round or six-round burst.

The Model 605 prototypes used what appeared to be an M16E1/M16A1 upper receiver forging but with the forward assist deleted and the hump mostly machined off. Both prototypes used the standard rifle-length buttstock.

Despite the failure of Colt's CAR-15 program to produce a successful carbine variant, in the mid 1990s Bushmaster manufactured a similar firearm based on the semi-automatic civilian market M16A2. The Bushmaster XM-15 Dissipatior used a 16 inch barrel (for NFA compliance) and standard rifle length handguard and front sight location, but differed significantly in that it used a M4 length gas system with a gas block separate from the front sight block hidden under the handguard. In the early 2020s, Brownells manufactured their BRN-605, a "retro-rifle" clone of the first prototype CAR-15 carbine but used a 16 inch barrel instead of 15 inch (for NFA compliance), but the Brownells clone used the same rifle length gas system as the first Model 605 prototype.

=== CAR-15 Submachine Gun (Model 607) ===
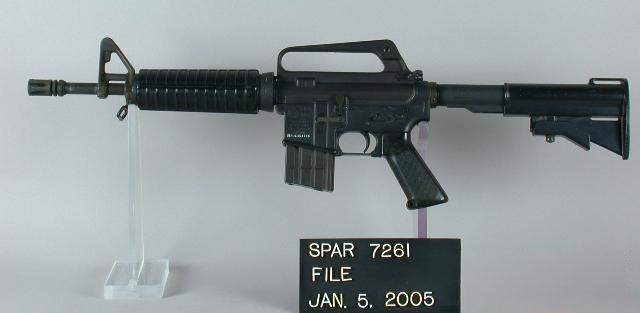
CAR-15 Submachine Gun

As early as 1964, United States Navy SEALs were testing prototypes of what would become the Model 607 SMG. Colt's manufactured approximately 50 of these for evaluation. Most were issued to Navy SEALs and Army Special Forces, though some were also given to Army K-9 units.

In 1965, Colt introduced the Model 607 Submachine Gun. This was the first AR-15 made with a retractable buttstock and was as a product of the development of Colt's SMG prototypes. Its overall length was only 26 inches (660 mm) with the buttstock collapsed. The retractable buttstock resembled a shortened version of the fixed buttstock, but a two-position latch recessed in the back allowed it to be extended and locked into position, increasing the length of pull by 2.7 inches (69 mm). The barrel is too short to mount a bayonet, so the SMG had no bayonet lug. It was a compact weapon for use by special forces and vehicle crewmen. The dictionary definition of submachine gun is an automatic firearm that fires pistol-caliber cartridges. However, manufacturers such as Colt, Heckler & Koch, and Zastava Arms have referred to compact carbines as submachine guns, to emphasize their short length and to differentiate them from longer carbines.

The Model 607 never went into production, but the limited success during the prototype development resulted in further interest by the U.S. Army and U.S Air Force. The first models were made with M16 receivers without forward assists and with shortened pistol grips from the Survival Rifle (see below). The later Model 607A was made with XM16E1 receiver with forward assist and standard pistol grip. The handguard was made from full-length rifle handguard by cutting it in half and using either the fore or aft pair, after machining the ends to fit the slip ring and handguard cap.

Because of the short barrel, the CAR-15 SMGs suffered from a loud and bright muzzle blast, and a number of muzzle devices were developed to reduce this. The SMGs were initially fitted with the standard M16 rifle's "duckbill" or three-prong flash hiders, which did not alleviate the problem. In September 1966, Colt developed a 3.5-inch (89 mm) long moderator that lessened the noise and muzzle flash, which also increased the weapon's reliability by increasing the amount of back pressure. However, the moderator created its own problems, such as heavy bore fouling and causing tracer bullets to wildly yaw. A 4.25-inch (108 mm) long moderator with six slots and an expansion chamber, which further reduced noise and flash, replaced the previous muzzle device and became standard for the SMG and the Commando series, but fouling and tracer problems persisted.

=== Colt Commando (XM177 & GAU-5) ===
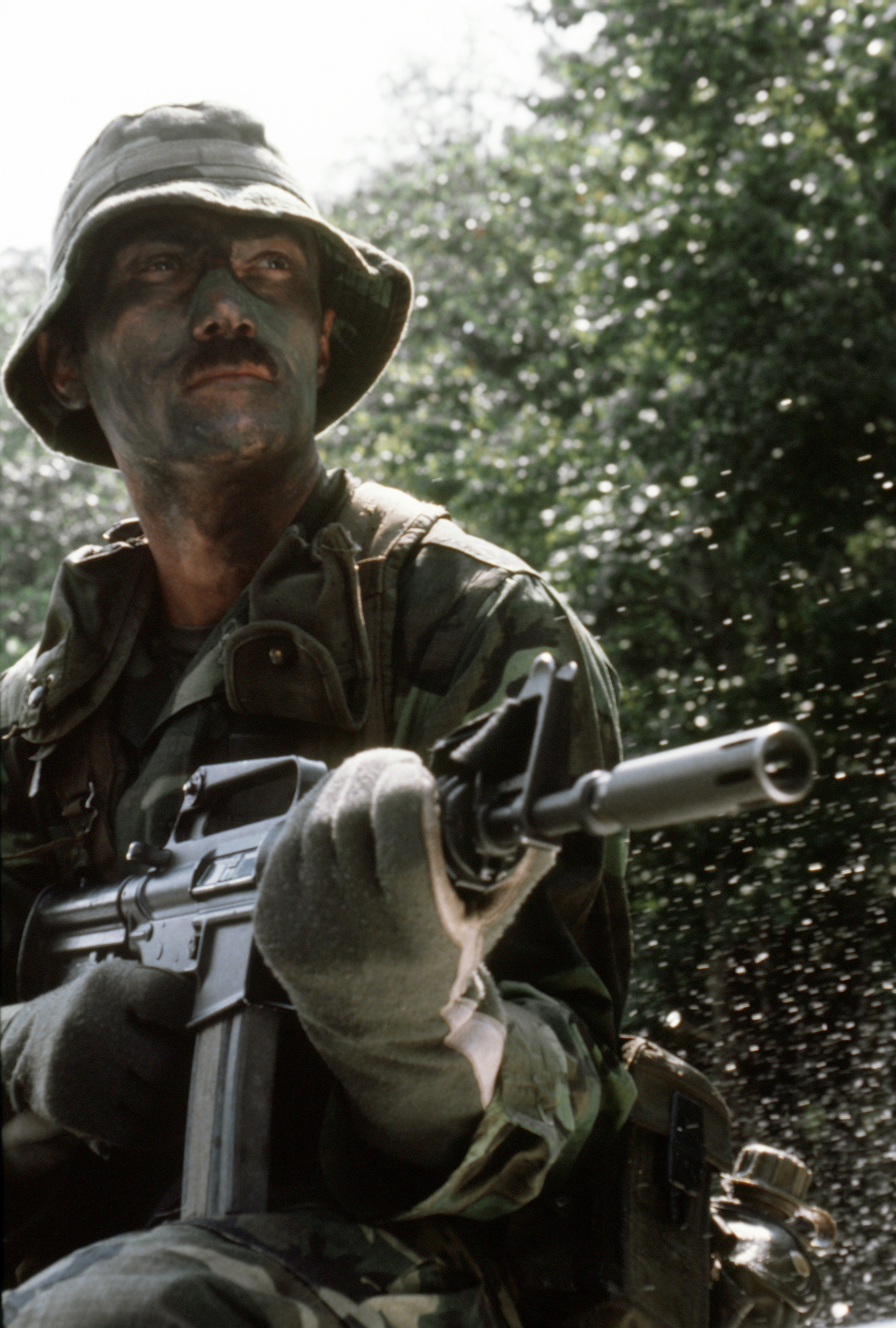
A USAF Combat Control Team member with a GAU-5A/A carbine and flash suppressor.

The Colt Commando was an outgrowth of the CAR-15 Military Weapons System, specifically the Model 607, as a result of interest by the U.S. Army for a fully developed weapon. It was introduced by Colt in 1966 in response to the US military's desire for a shorter M16 and without the Model 607 SMG's inadequacies. Colt engineer Rob Roy designed a simpler two-position telescoping tubular aluminum buttstock to replace the complicated extending triangular version. The fragile and ad hoc triangular handguards were replaced by reinforced round handguards. Each half of the round handguard is identical, simplifying logistics by not requiring a top/bottom or left/right pair. The Model 609 Commando has a forward assist, while the Model 610 Commando does not. A Model 610B with a four-position selector was available, but not used by the U.S. military. All versions are equipped with the 4.25-inch (108 mm) long moderator.

The XM177 uses a unique flash suppressor sometimes called a flash or sound moderator for its 10-inch (250 mm) barrel. This device is 4.2 inches (110 mm) long and was designed primarily as a counterbalance measure as the shorter barrel makes the weapon unwieldy. This device reduces flash signature greatly and sound signature slightly, making the normally louder short barreled carbine sound like a longer barreled M16A1. Although it has no internal baffles and does not completely reduce the sound signature to subsonic levels, because it alters the sound level of the weapon, the US Bureau of Alcohol Tobacco Firearms and Explosives has declared this muzzle device to be a sound suppressor and regulates its civilian purchase in the United States.

The Model 610 was classified as the XM177 but adopted by the Air Force as the GAU-5/A Submachine Gun (GAU for "Gun, Aircraft, Unit," as it was listed in the aviation equipment nomenclature system, even though not mounted on an aircraft). The Army purchased 2,815 Model 609 CAR-15 Commandos on June 28, 1966, which were officially designated Submachine Gun, 5.56 mm, XM177E1. As part of the contract, Colt was supposed to supply each XM177E1s with seven 30-round magazines, but Colt was unable to build a reliable 30-round curved magazine that would fit in the M16 magazine well, so most XM177E1s were shipped with 20-round magazines. The exception was 5th Special Forces Group, who received a total of four early 30-round magazines. Colt completed delivery of the purchased XM177E1s in March 1967, but the 30 round magazines did not become available until November 1967.

In 1967, in response to field testing, Colt lengthened the Commando's barrel from 10 to 11.5 inches (254 to 292 mm). The increased length reduced noise and muzzle flash, and allowed fitting of the Colt XM148 grenade launcher. A metal boss was added to the moderator for mounting of the XM148 and rifle grenades. The chambers were chrome-plated. The Commandos with the longer barrels were called the Model 629 and Model 649. The Model 629 Commando has a forward assist; the Model 649 Commando does not.

In April 1967, the Army purchased 510 Model 629 Commandos for use by troops assigned to the Military Assistance Command, Vietnam Studies and Observations Group (MACV-SOG), and designated them XM177E2. Delivery was completed by the end of September 1967. The Air Force adopted a similar model without the forward assist feature as the GAU-5A/A. Sources debate whether or not this was a Colt Model 630 or Model 649. According to John Plaster and other sources, the lack of 30-round magazines continued to be problematic and SOG operators resorted to pooling their personal resources and purchasing the larger capacity magazines on the civilian U.S. market. Problems with range, accuracy, barrel fouling, and usage of tracer bullets continued to plague the XM177 series, but Colt estimated that it would take a six-month $400,000 program to do a complete ballistic and kinematic study. There were also recommendations for a 29-month $635,000 research and development program. Both recommendations were declined by the U.S. military as American ground force involvement in the Vietnam War was gradually winding down. Production of the CAR-15 Commando ended in 1970.

=== CAR-15 Survival Rifle (Model 608) ===
The Model 608 CAR-15 Survival Rifle was meant for use by downed aircrew. Because of the CAR-15's modular design, the Survival Rifle could be broken down into two subassemblies and stowed with four 20-round magazines in a pilot's seat pack. Resembling a Colt Commando, it also has a 10-inch (250 mm) barrel and is 29 inches (740 mm) in overall length when assembled. The Survival Rifle used a fixed tubular plastic-coated aluminum buttstock and a round handguard that were not used on the other CAR-15 versions, and did not have either a forward assist or a bayonet lug. The pistol grip was chopped down, and the muzzle was equipped with either a conical flash hider or the 3.5-inch (89 mm) long moderator. Around 10 of the Model 608 were known to be manufactured.

== Post-Vietnam ==
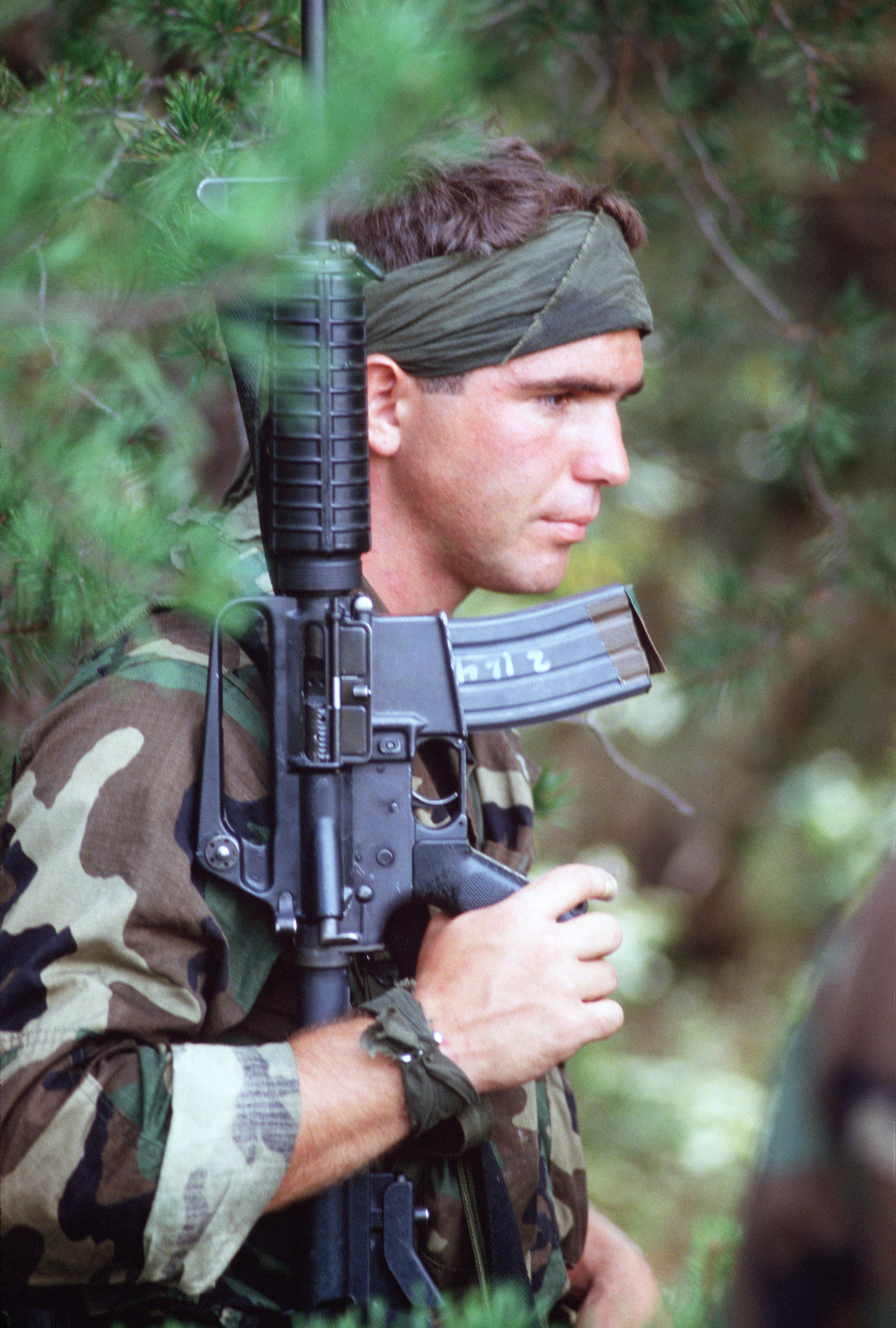
A United States Navy SEAL holding a Colt Commando carbine.

After the Vietnam War, Colt abandoned the CAR-15 Modular Weapon System concept, but continued to develop short barrel carbines. These were marketed as "M16s", while the civilian and law-enforcement semi-automatic counterparts were marketed as "Colt AR-15s", though they were all commonly called CAR-15s.

=== M16 Carbine (CAR-15) ===
In the early 1970s, Colt began development of an M16 carbine with a 14.5-inch (370 mm) long pencil barrel. The barrel length was compatible with the existing carbine-length gas system and allowed for the mounting of a standard M16 bayonet. Despite having a longer barrel, it is no longer than the Colt Commando, as the longer barrel did not require the long 4.5 inch moderator of the XM177 series, only the much shorter M16 birdcage-type flash hider. Colt labeled the M16 carbines the Model 651, 652, 653, or 654, depending on whether or not it had a fixed or retractable buttstock, or a forward assist. Only the Model 653 M16A1 carbine, with retractable buttstock and forward assist would be purchased in significant numbers by the U.S. military. The Malaysian Armed Forces and the Armed Forces of the Philippines, purchased Model 653s in small numbers for special operations forces or security forces.

==== GUU-5/P ====
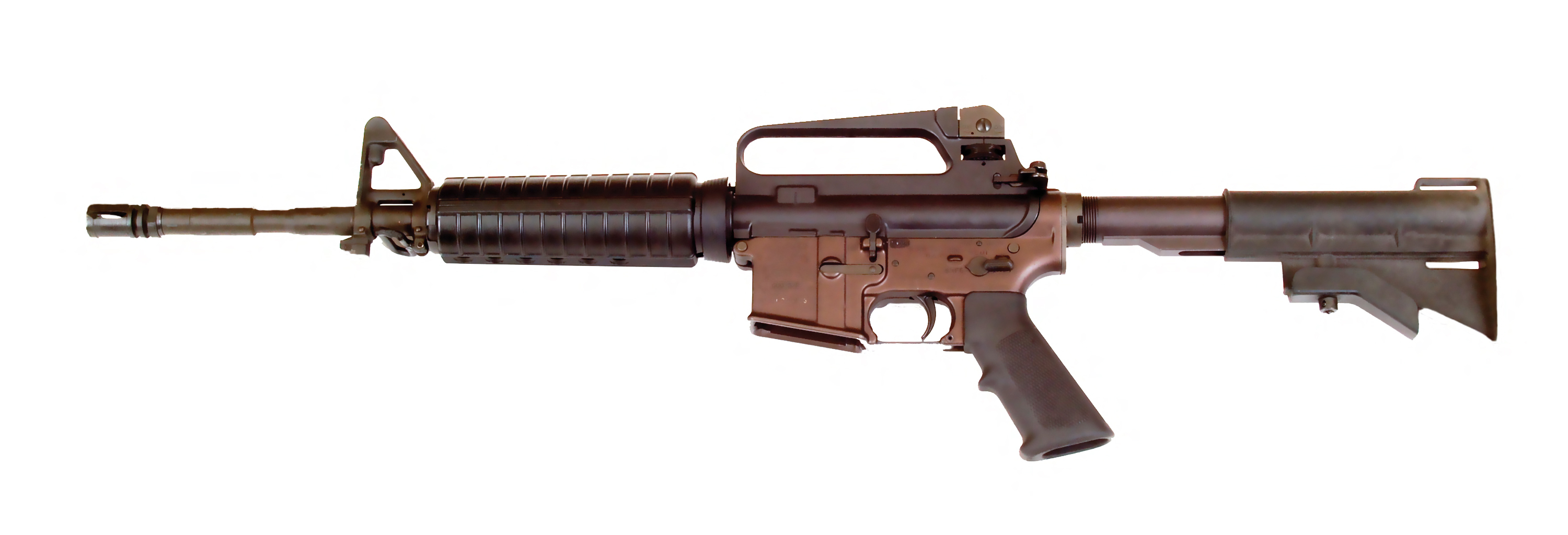
United States Air Force GUU-5/P Carbine

The GUU-5/P (Gun, Utility, Unit) was a result of United States Air Force making ad-hoc upgrades to its GAU-5 series. The barrels and flash suppressor were replaced with the longer 14.5-inch (370 mm) barrel with a 1-in-12 twist, but the weapons retained their original designations. With the change to M855 cartridges, they either received 1-in-7 twist barrel or complete upper receiver assembly replacements. The GAU-5s markings were also removed and the weapons were re-stamped GUU-5/P. Some were built on new FN contract M16A2 receivers, with the BURST marking milled out and AUTO stamped in place. These were used by the British Special Air Service during the Falklands War.

=== M4 carbine ===
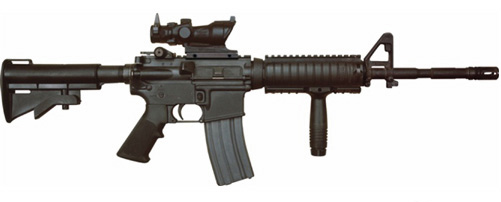
Colt M4A1 Carbine with ACOG optic and a vertical forward grip

In the early 1980s, at the request of the United States Marine Corps, Colt upgraded the M16A1 rifle, resulting in the M16A2 rifle. Among the major changes were a reinforced lower receiver, a case deflector, a birdcage flash suppressor redesigned to prevent downward blast, and a barrel with a faster 1-in-7 twist. The faster barrel was necessitated by the switch from the 55-grain M193 bullet to the 62-grain M855 bullet. The M16A2 rifle's barrel was also thicker for the portion in front of the handguard. Colt incorporated these changes into its carbines, which it called M16A2 carbines. The Model 723 M16A2 carbine used the iron sights of the M16A1, but had a case deflector. The barrel had a 1-in-7 twist, but the thinner profile of the older M16A1 carbine's barrel. As with the Model 653, the United States military made small purchases of the Model 723 for its special operation forces. It was notably used by Delta Force operators from the late 1980s to the early 1990s.

In 1983, Diemaco developed a carbine similar to the Model 723, the C8 carbine for use by the Canadian Forces. The original C8s were built by Colt as the Model 725. In 1984, the U.S. government asked Colt to develop a carbine with maximum commonality with the issue M16A2. Colt named the carbine as the XM4. The project would eventually culminate in the development and official adoption of the M4 carbine in 1994.

==== M4 Commando ====
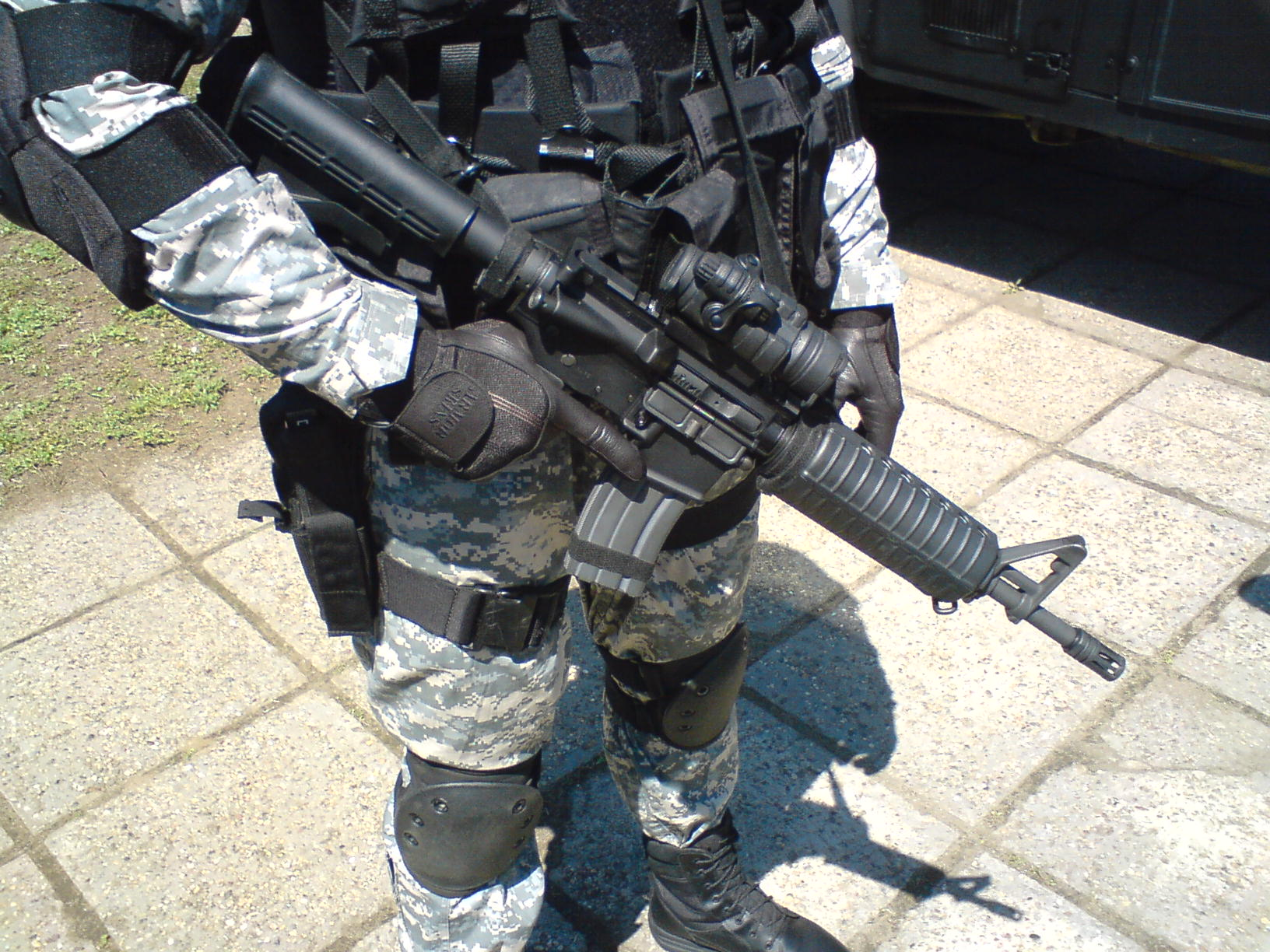
Serbian gendarme with a Colt M4 Commando

Though Colt has focused its attention on carbines with 14.5-inch (370 mm) barrels and rifles with 20-inch (510 mm) barrels, Colt continues to make carbines with 11.5 inches (290 mm) barrels, which it calls Commandos. Originally, Commandos were assembled from whatever spare parts were available, so Model 733 Commandos could have A1-style upper receivers with case deflectors or A2-style upper receivers, and M16A1-profile 1:7 or M16A2-profile 1:7 barrels. Depending on the specific models, Commandos may have had three-position fire control groups (safe/semi-automatic/three-round burst), or four-position having both full-automatic and burst. The modern Model 933 has a "flattop" receiver, with a removable carrying handle and a MIL-STD-1913 Picatinny rail, with semi-automatic and automatic fire. The Model 935 Commando has the features of the Model 933, but has three-round burst fire instead of automatic. Though originally called the M16A2 Commando, Colt now markets them as the M4 Commando.

The M4 Commando with its short 11.5-inch (290 mm) barrel suffers the same failings as its predecessors: a substantially lower muzzle velocity and greater muzzle flash, in comparison to longer M16 rifles and carbines. The lower muzzle velocity can reduce carbines' wounding effects. However, United States Marine Corps Force Reconnaissance personnel sometimes used M4 Commandos in place of their M9 pistols. United States Army Special Operations Command Groups also use M4 Commandos as self-defense weapons. United States Navy SEALs use the ultra-compact Mk 18 Mod 0 with its 10.3-inch (260 mm) barrel in a similar role.

==== GAU-5A Aircrew Self Defense Weapon ====
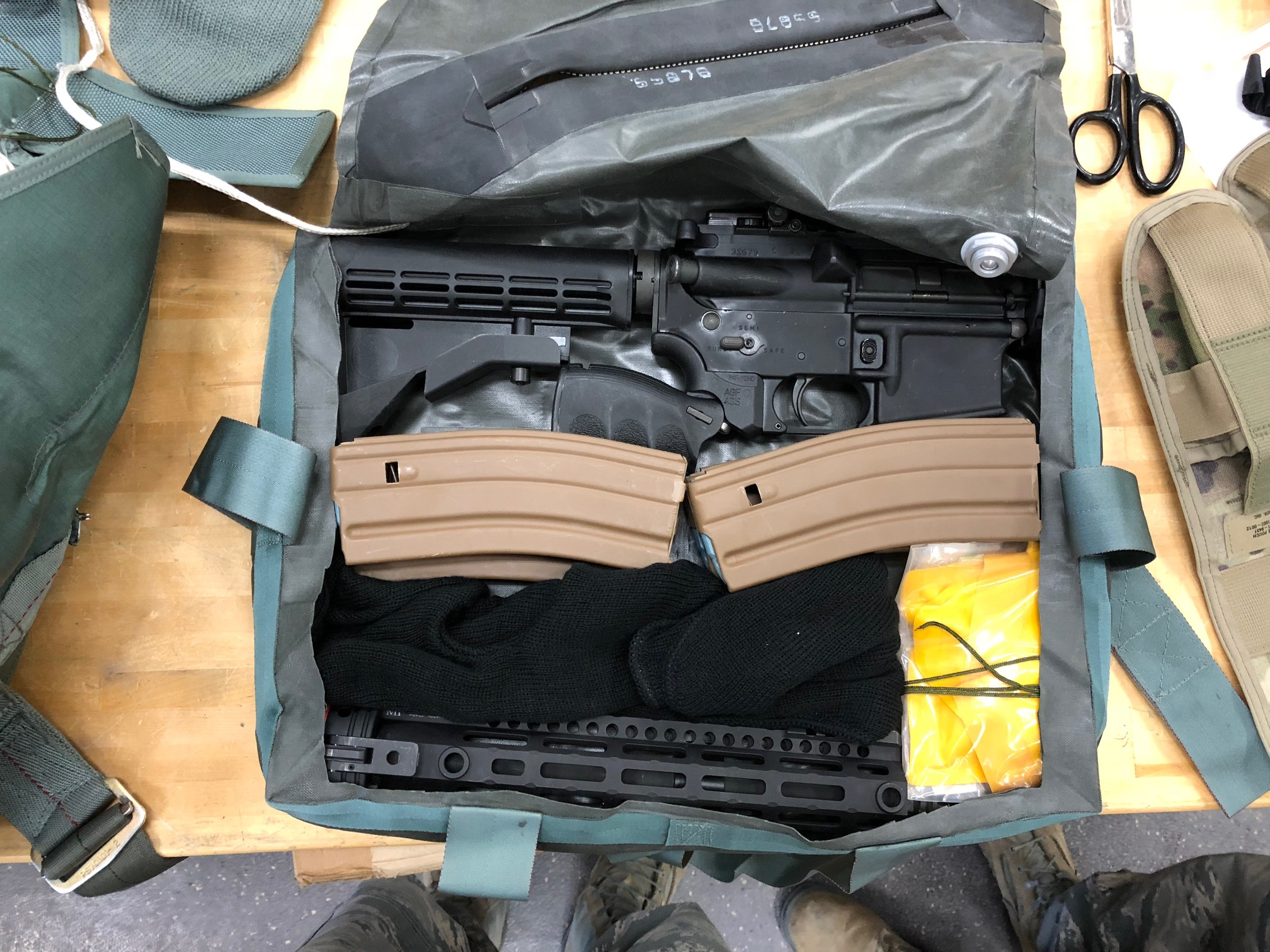
The US Air Force's GAU-5A packed in the ACES II ejection seat's survival kit

In 2019, a solution to give a personal firepower upgrade over the traditional sidearm for US aircrews in ACES ejection seat–equipped aircraft was to use commercially available AR-15 rifle parts including a special short quick-release barrel, collapsible stock, folding pistol-grip, and four magazines to fit inside the survival kit pan of the ejection seat. Major Gibson, an Air Force spokesperson, said, "This has driven the dimension of 16 × 14 × 3.5 inches." The Aircrew Self Defense Weapon is to be included in survival kits for A-10, B-1, B-2, B-52, F-15C, F-15E, F-16, and F-22 aircraft. The rifle is being built at U.S. Air Force Gunsmith Shop at Joint Base San Antonio-Lackland, Texas. 2,137 GAU-5A ASDWs are planned.

== Gallery ==
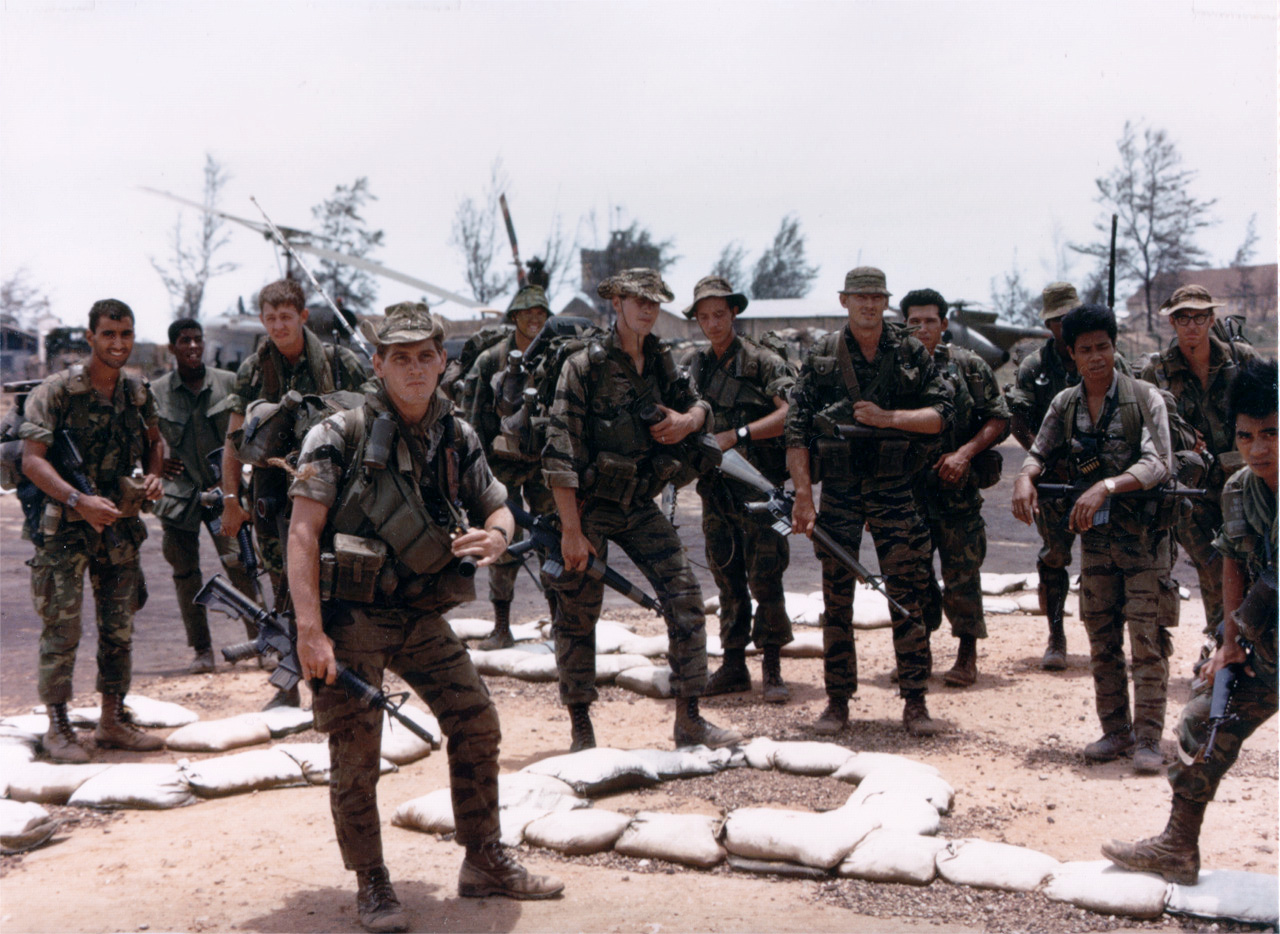
Two 1st Cavalry Division Long Range Reconnaissance Patrol teams, Quang Tri, Vietnam, armed in part with CAR-15s, in July 1968.

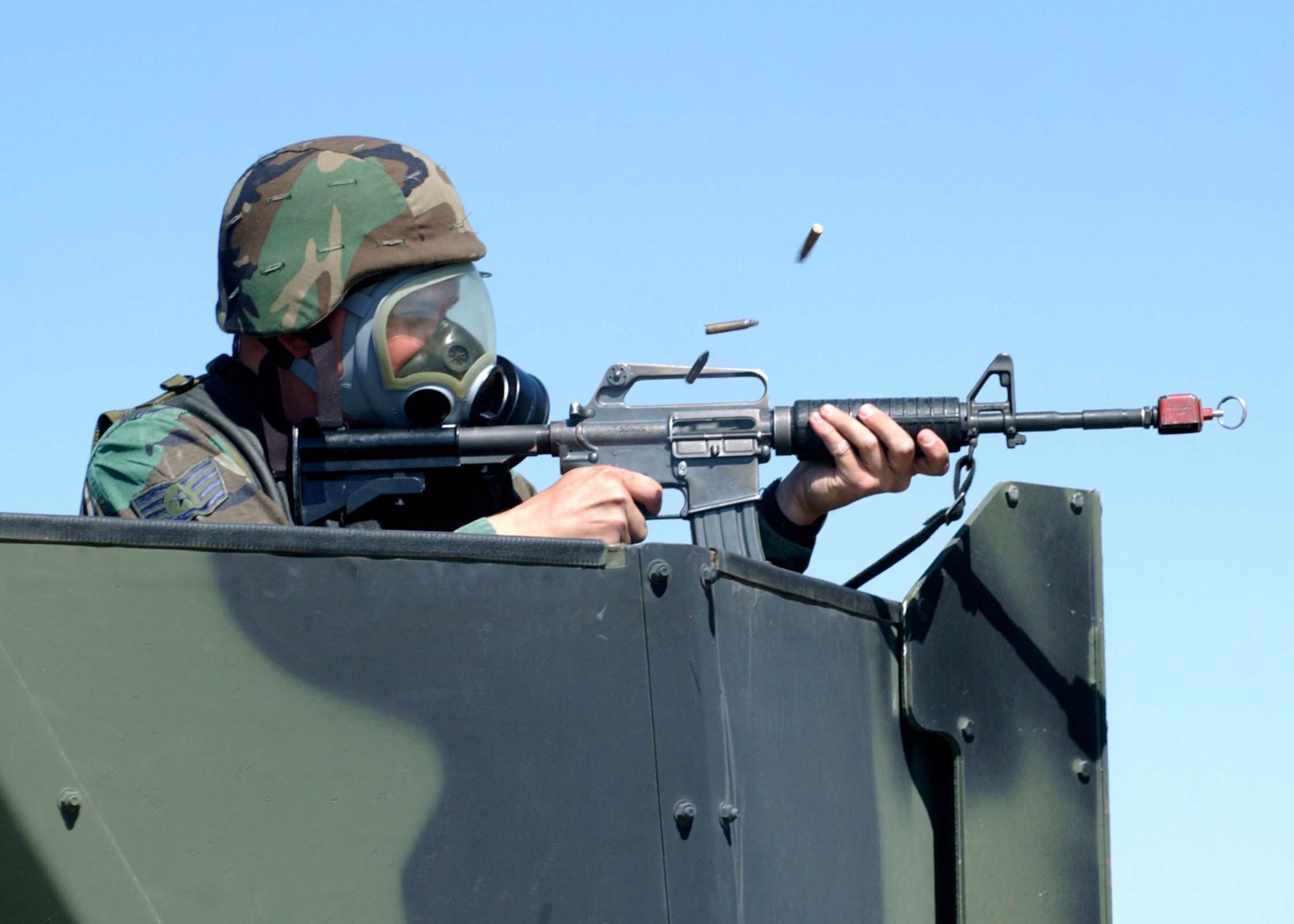
USAF Staff Sergeant with a GAU-5/A converted to a GUU-5/P and fitted with a Blank Firing Adaptor (BFA) for firing blanks.

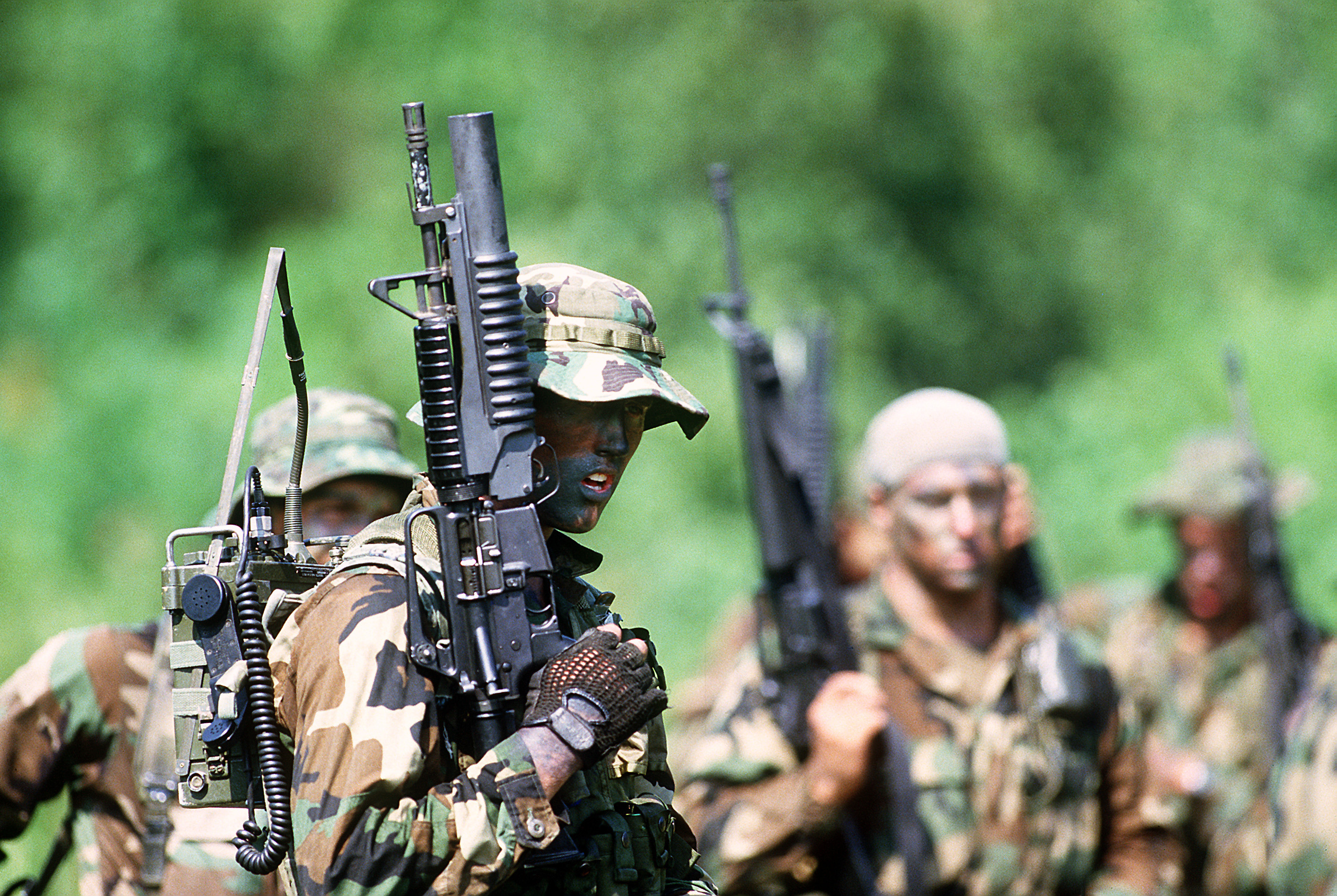
The U.S. Navy SEAL in the foreground is carrying a field radio and is armed with a Colt Model 653 carbine equipped with an M203 grenade launcher.

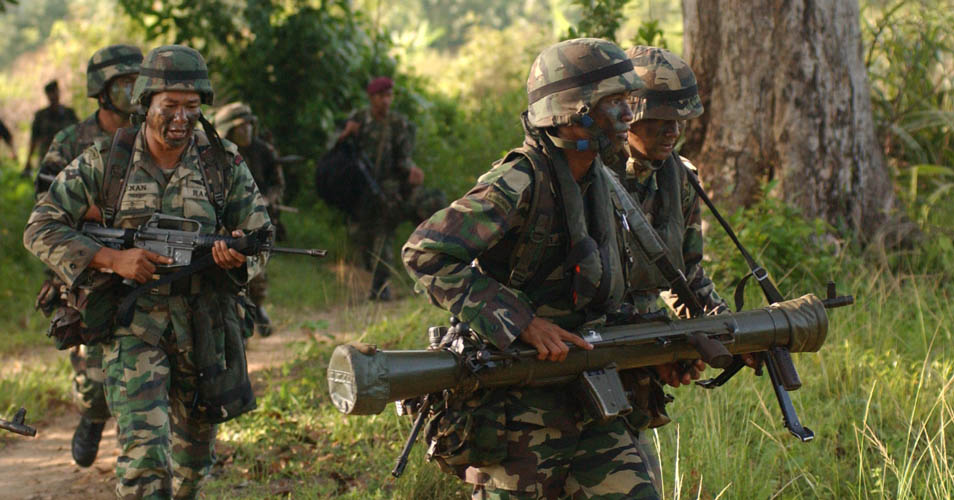
A Malaysian Army operative (left) holding the M16A1 carbine.

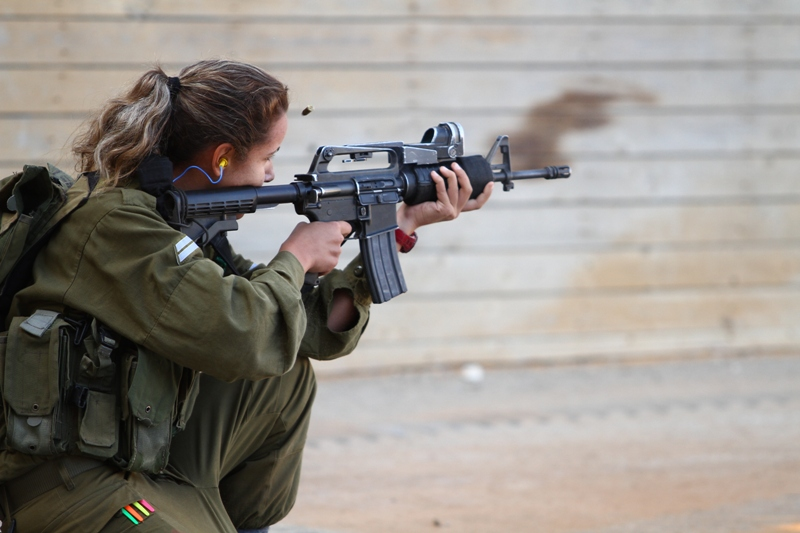
IDF soldier firing a Colt Model 653 with MEPRO 21 reflex sight.

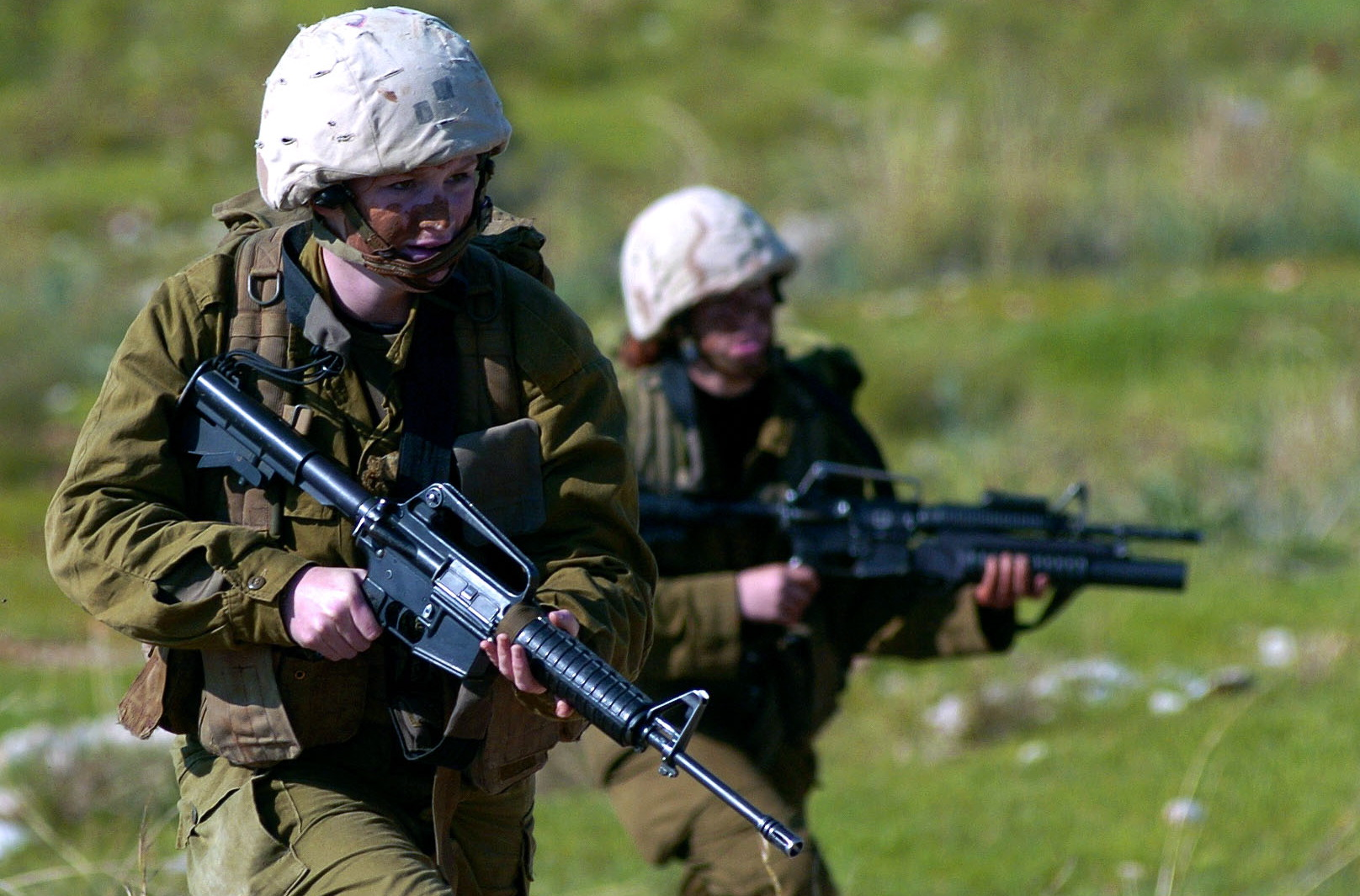
Model 653 Carbines in the IDF.

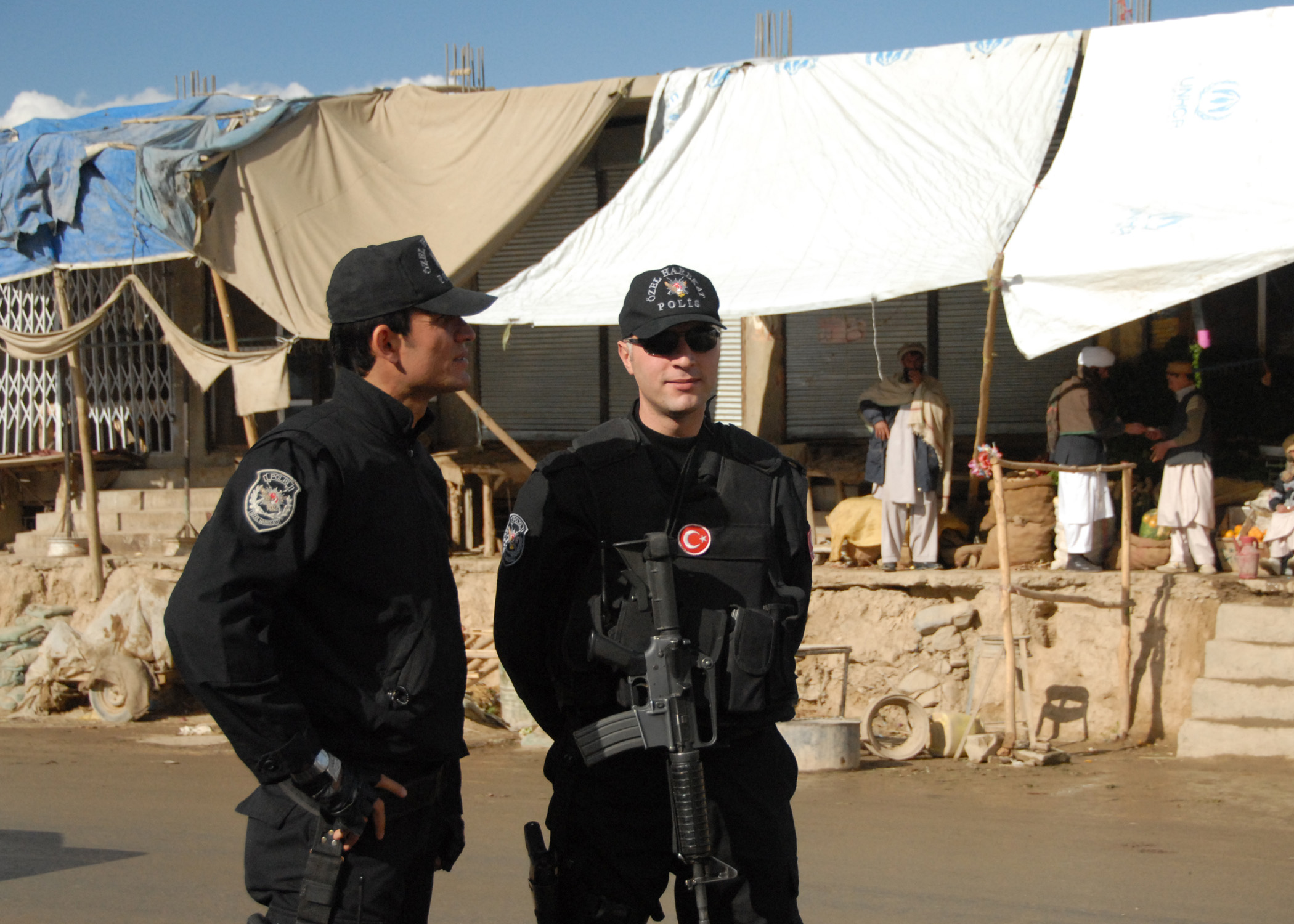
Model 723 type carbine in usage of Turkish Police Special Operation Department in Afghanistan.

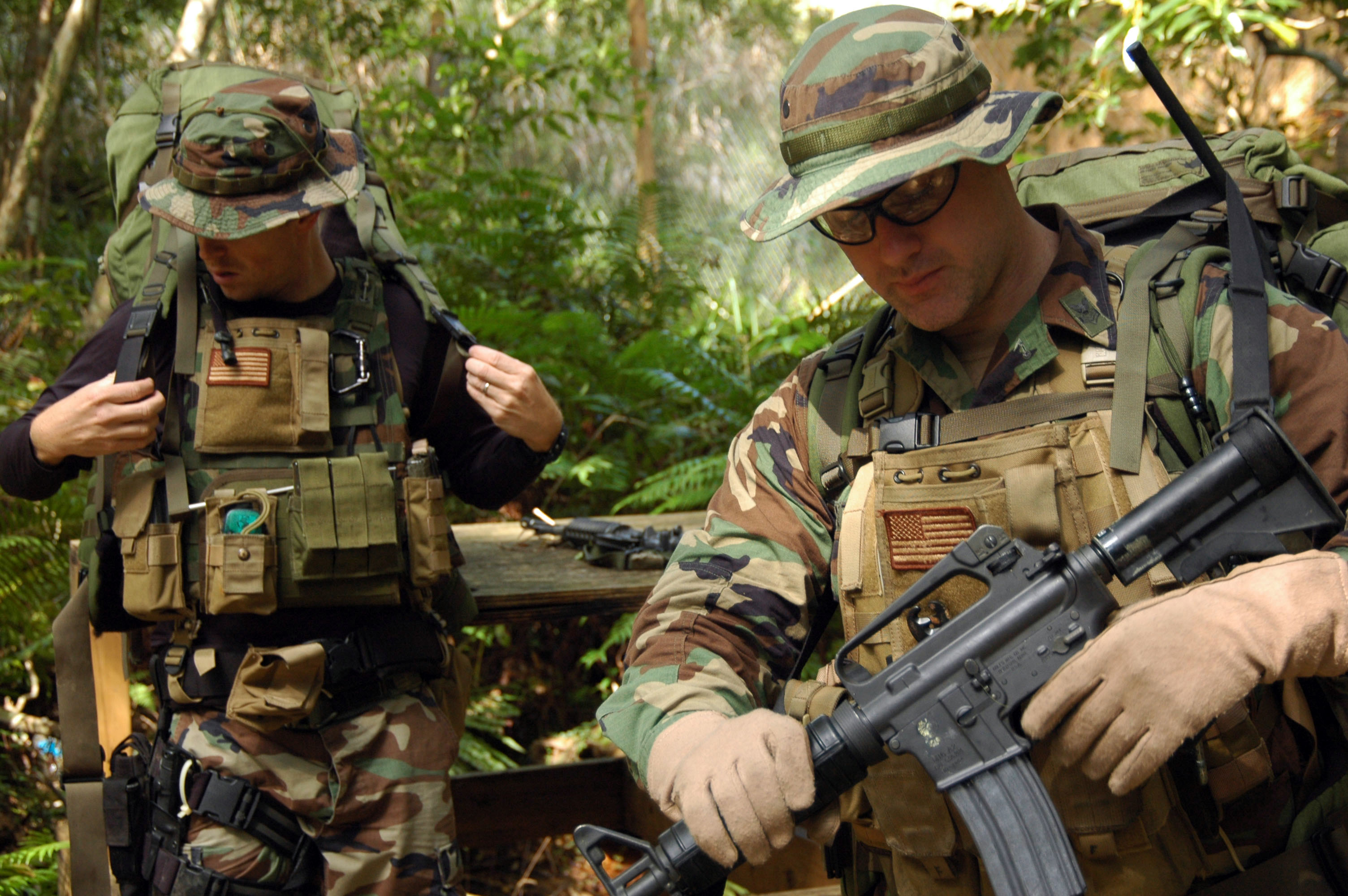
US Navy EOD ordnanceman with a Colt Model 727 carbine.

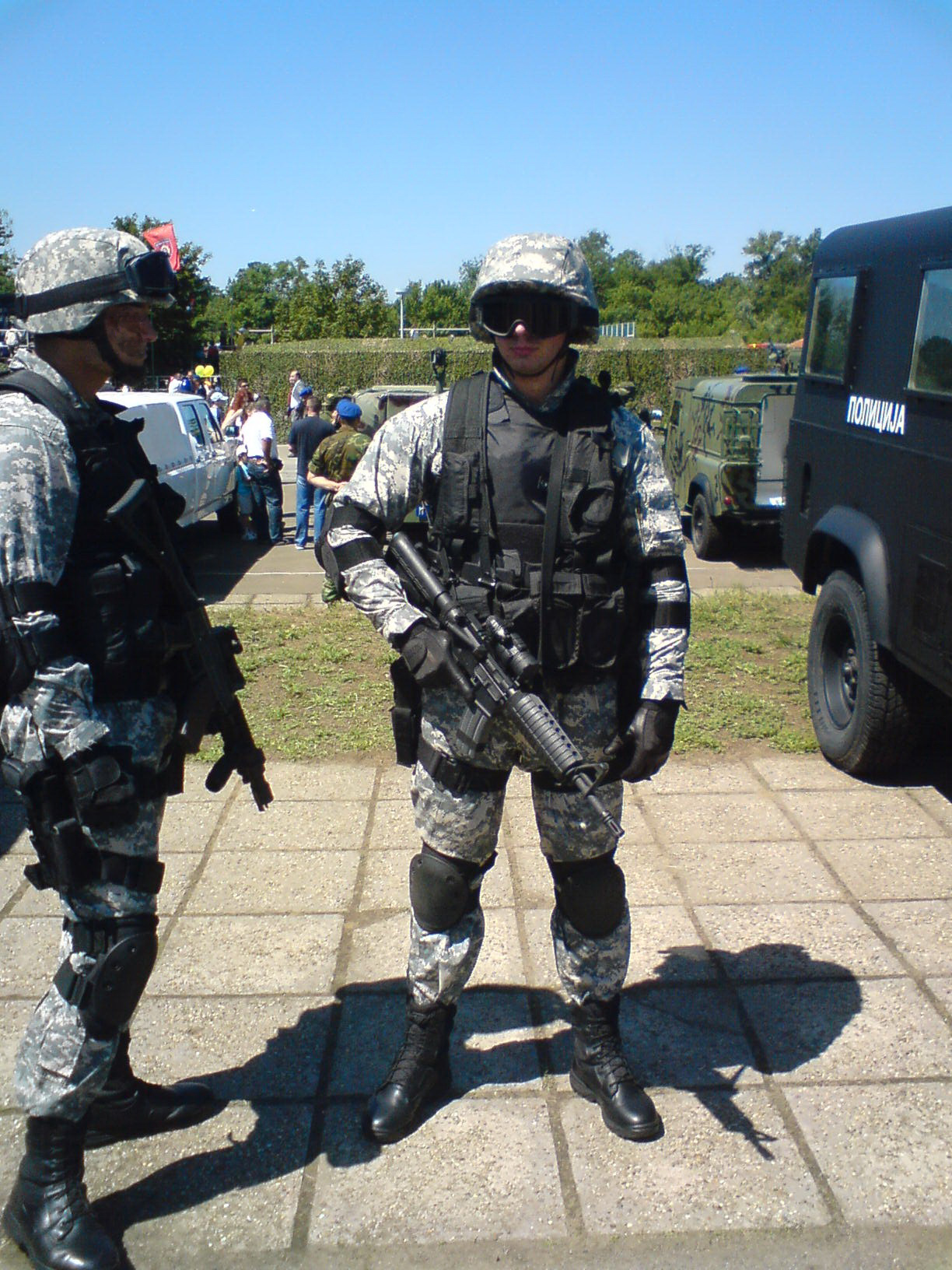
Serbian SAJ police, the one in the center holding a Colt Model 933 while the one on the left holds a SIG SG 552.

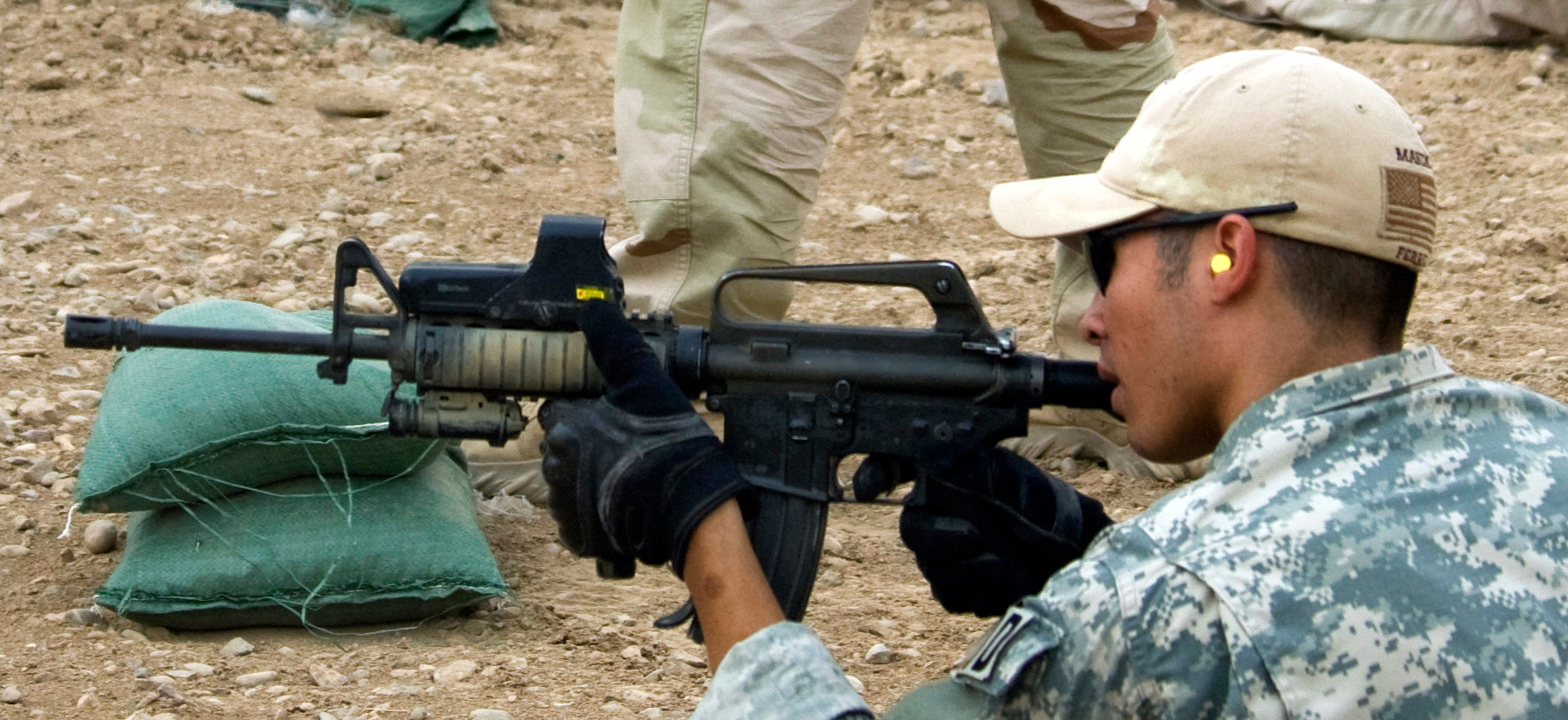
Example of a M16A1-type carbine modified with a rail interface system handguard to support Picatinny rail-compatible sights and accessories.

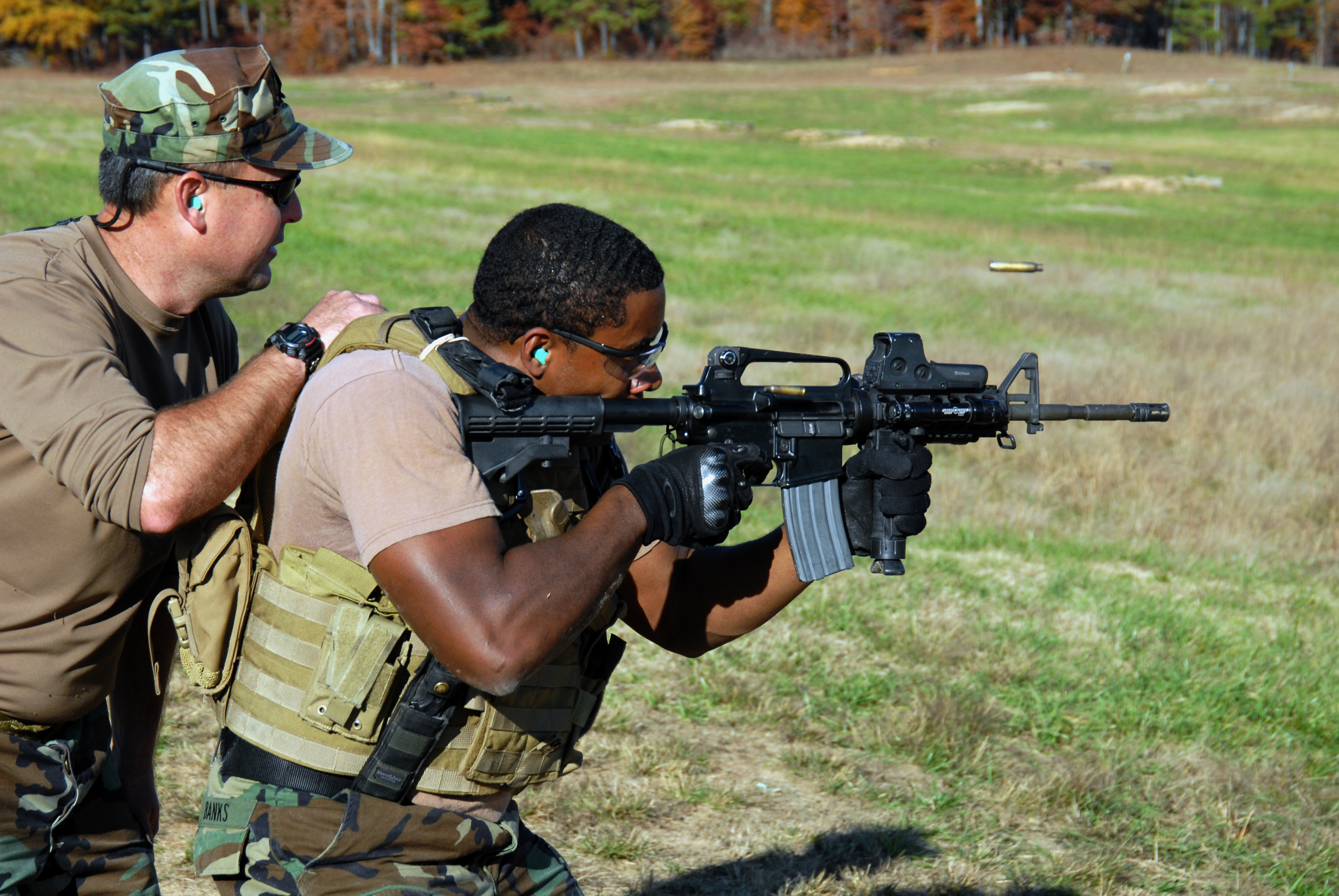
Example of a M16A2-type carbine modified with a rail interface system handguard to support Picatinny rail-compatible sights and accessories.

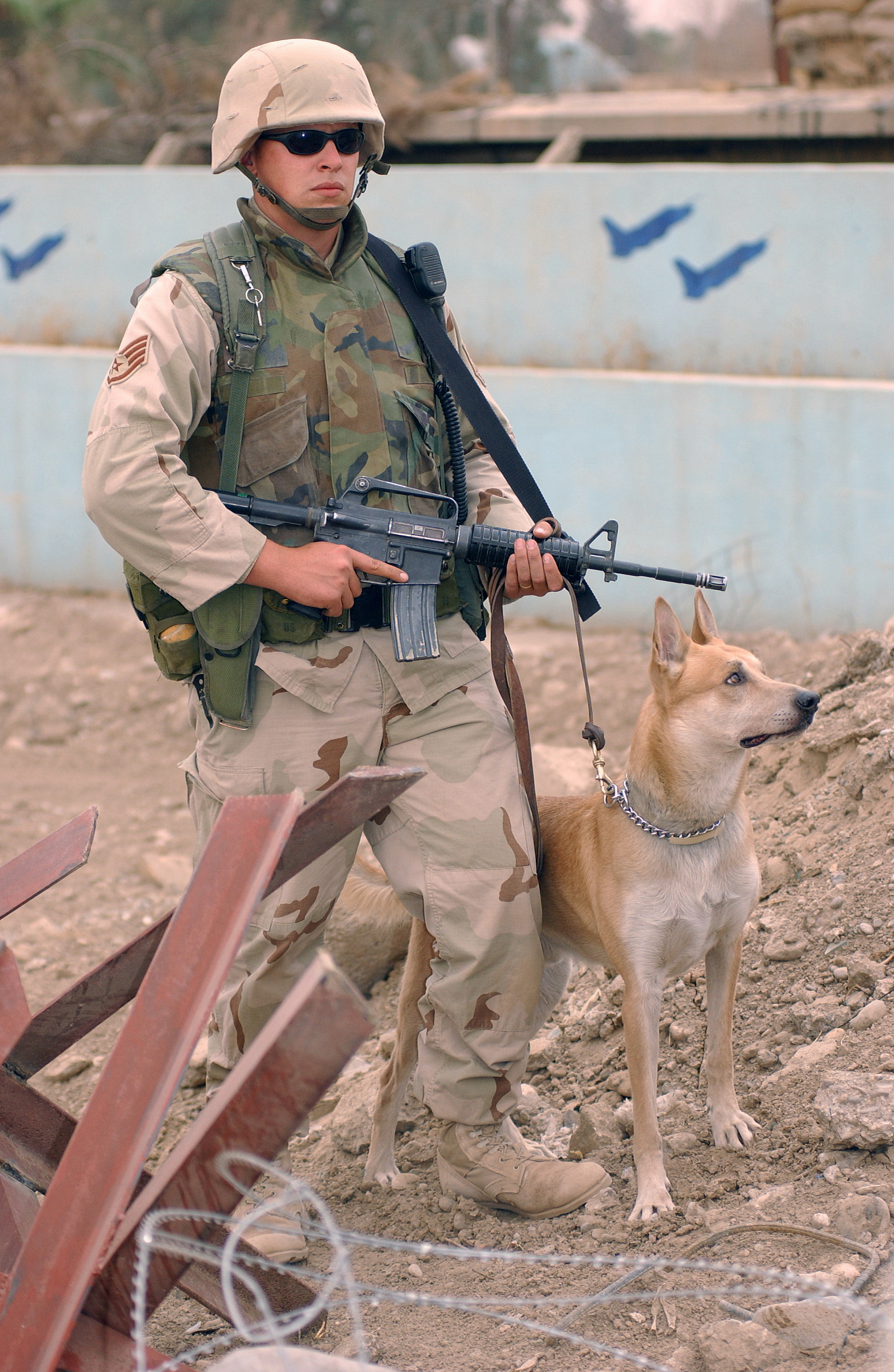
USAF Sergeant from 506th Expeditionary Security Forces Squadron with rebuilt carbine with Model 653 upper receiver in Kirkuk, 2003.

== See also ==
- Colt Automatic Rifle
- Close Quarters Battle Receiver
- AKS-74U - Soviet/Russian counterpart
- QBZ-95B - Chinese counterpart
- Comparison of the AK-47 and M16
