= April 1980 =

Month of 1980

<<	April 1980					>>
Su	Mo	Tu	We	Th	Fr	Sa
		1	2	3	4	5
6	7	8	9	10	11	12
13	14	15	16	17	18	19
20	21	22	23	24	25	26
27	28	29	30

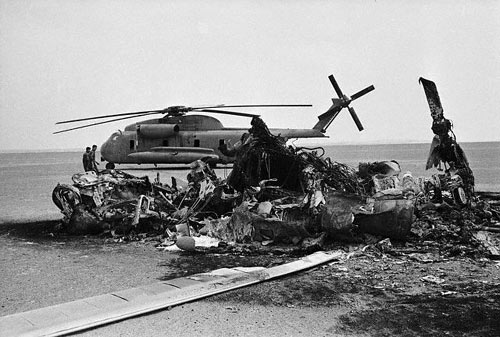
April 25, 1980: Desert One attempt to rescue hostages fails

April 25, 1980: Republic of Zimbabwe becomes independent

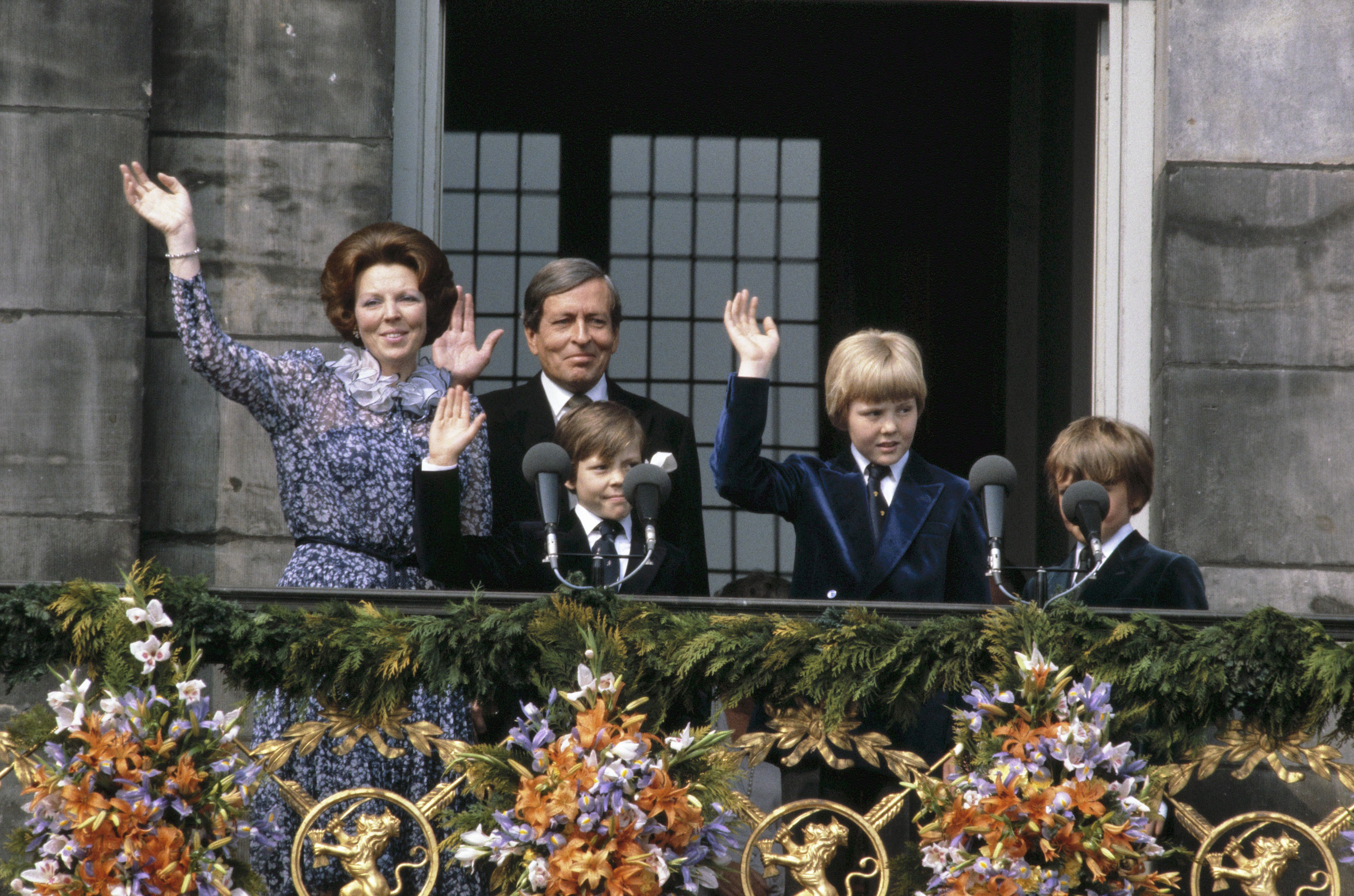
April 30, 1980: Queen Beatrix takes throne as Netherlands' third consecutive female monarch

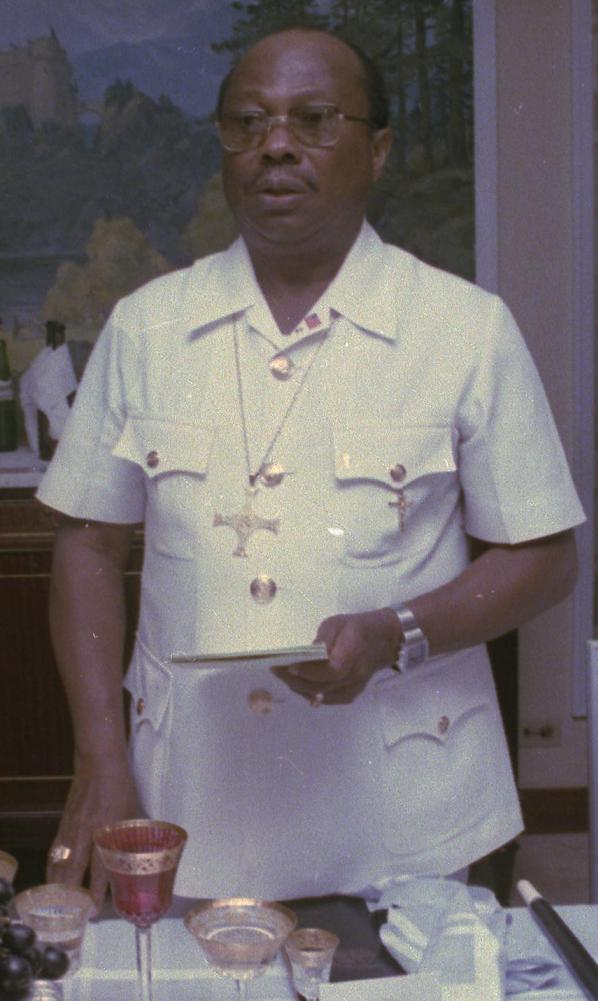
April 12, 1980: Liberia's President Tolbert assassinated in revolution

The following events happened in April 1980:

== April 1, 1980 (Tuesday) ==
- The 1980 United States census was taken, with the United States Bureau of the Census counting everyone who had been born on and before April 1 and who had still been alive at the time that the census form was completed. The initial announcement by the Bureau on December 31 would be that the population was 226,504,825. The adjusted official figure, made public by the Bureau on April 19, 1982, was 226,545,805 United States residents.
- Boston television station WNAC-TV aired a fake news bulletin at the end of the 6 o'clock news which reported that Great Blue Hill in Milton, Massachusetts, had become an erupting volcano, and presented a report "complete with film of flowing lava, burning houses and edited remarks from President Jimmy Carter and Governor Edward J. King". Though intended as an April Fool's Day joke, the fake news bulletin on Channel 7 was believed by many of the residents of Milton, and the city's police department received more than 100 calls from panicked viewers. The executive producer of the 6 o'clock news, Homer Cilley, was fired by the WNAC station for "his failure to exercise good news judgment" and for violating Federal Communications Commission rules about showing stock footage without identifying it as such.
- Iran's de facto leader, the Ayatollah Ruhollah Khomeini, announced through a speech delivered by his son Ahmad Khomeini that there would be no transfer of the 50 U.S. Embassy hostages from their student captors to Iranian government control, despite what appeared to be an agreement between the U.S. and Iranian governments. The elder Khomeini described the American proposal as "diabolic trickery" and Iran's President Abolhassan Banisadr said that the U.S. would need to "remain silent on the issue" until the newly elected Parliament could convene in June.
- The Southern African Development Community (SADCC) was formed by the leaders of nine nations— Angola, Botswana, Lesotho, Malawi, Mozambique, Swaziland, Zambia and Zimbabwe — at a summit in the Zambian capital at Lusaka.
- Syrian Special Forces began the Siege of Aleppo to suppress the Syrian Muslim Brotherhood, an anti-government movement that had started with strikes in March. By Saturday, troops, tanks and armored vehicles from the Syrian Army's Third Division arrived in the city and began arresting dissidents. During the occupation, which would continue for ten months, at least 1,000 residents were killed and 8,000 others arrested.
- California Governor Jerry Brown dropped out of the race for the Democratic Party nomination of president, after coming in third place in the Wisconsin and Kansas primaries.
- The Major League Baseball Players Association (MLBPA) executive board voted to open the 1980 baseball season, but to cancel all remaining exhibition games and to set a May 23 strike date if their May 22 deadline for an agreement was not signed. The exhibition season had eight more days to run, from April 2 to April 9.
- Born:
  - Hafiz Bakhshaliyev, Azerbaijani World Kickboxing Champion between 2004 and 2008; in Nakhchivan, Azerbaijan SSR, Soviet Union
  - Randy Orton, American WWE professional wrestling champion; in Knoxville, Tennessee

== April 2, 1980 (Wednesday) ==
- The Crude Oil Windfall Profit Tax Act was signed into law by U.S. President Jimmy Carter. It would be repealed on August 23, 1988 after a continuing drop in the worldwide price of oil.
- The St. Pauls Riot broke out in Bristol after local police raided the Black and White Café on suspicion of narcotics sales. At the height of the riot, 3,000 young Britons, both black Jamaicans and white, damaged local businesses and damaged police cars and fire trucks. Nineteen regular city policemen, normally unarmed except for clubs, were injured along with six rioters. After the outnumbered city police were ordered to withdraw, a unit of 400 helmeted riot police retook the St. Paul's section without incident.
- Born: Bobby Bones (stage name for Bobby Estell), American radio talk show host; in Hot Springs, Arkansas
- Died: Stanley F. Reed, 95, U.S. Supreme Court justice from 1938 to 1957

== April 3, 1980 (Thursday) ==
- The Federal Home Loan Bank Board voted to authorize savings and loan associations to offer the first adjustable-rate mortgage in the United States, changing existing regulations to offer the renegotiable-rate mortgage (RRM) to mortgagors for home purchases, the first variable rate mortgage in the United States. Under the regulations, the interest rate could be changed every three years, and could rise no more than 5 percentage points over the original APR life of a 30-year mortgage, or be lowered without limit. The new rule was made in response to a decrease in new housing starts and purchases by buyers hesitant about a long-term commitment to the high interest rates at the time, and was a concept similar to the "rollover mortgage" that were already in use in Canada.
- The Jet Propulsion Laboratory announced that the Viking 2 lander had ceased operating after having sent data from Mars for almost 3½ years. A spokesman for JPL in Pasadena, California said that the last useful transmission had been on January 31 and that the one made on March 15 was unintelligible. On September 3, 1976, Viking 2 had landed at the Utopia Planitia on Mars since ceased operation after its batteries were drained.
- Kosmos 1171, a Soviet satellite intended solely as a target for an anti-satellite weapon, was launched into orbit from the USSR's Plesetsk Cosmodrome. Between April 18 and April 20, Kosmos 1174 was used for three unsuccessful attempts to intercept and destroy the orbiting target, after which 1174 was given a self-destruct order. Thirty years after its launch, Kosmos 1171 remained in orbit.
- The two competing U.S. car racing organizations, the United States Auto Club (USAC) and Championship Auto Racing Teams (CART), agreed on a partial merger as the Championship Racing League (CRL), with USAC and CART jointly sanctioning the races of the 1980 Indy Car racing season. The partnership lasted for only five races, starting with the Datsun Twin 200 on April 13 in Ontario, California, and included the Indianapolis 500. After the Red Roof Inns 150 on July 13, the USAC withdrew from the agreement. Johnny Rutherford, who finished in first place of three of the races, was the champion of the brief CRL season.
- Born: Suella Braverman, Home Secretary of the United Kingdom since 2022; in Harrow, London
- Died:
  - Edward Bullard, 72, British geophysicist who found new evidence to confirm the continental drift
  - Mary McCarty, 56, American stage, film and TV character actress.

== April 4, 1980 (Friday) ==
- Puerto Rican terrorists Carlos Alberto Torres, Oscar López Rivera, Elizam Escobar, Adolfo Matos, and seven other members of the Puerto Rican nationalist group Fuerzas Armadas de Liberación Nacional Puertorriqueña (FALN), were arrested in the Chicago suburb of Evanston, Illinois on suspicion of complicity in 100 attempted and successful bombings over a six-year period. Torres had been on the FBI Ten Most Wanted Fugitives list since 1977. Evanston police were alerted by a resident who had called concerning suspicious activity by nine people who were making repeated trips to and from a van parked "in the 1200 block of Forest Avenue". Many of the group would accept an offer of presidential clemency on September 7, 1999. López Rivera would refuse clemency and remain in federal prison until the commutation of his 55-year prison sentence in 2017.
- Fidel Castro removed the Cuban police who had been guarding the Peruvian Embassy in Havana, allowing the embassy grounds to become a haven for dissatisfied Cuban citizens. After the police were removed, hundreds of Cubans entered the diplomatic protection of the embassy grounds.
- The radical environmental advocacy group Earth First! was founded by Dave Foreman and four other men— Howie Wolke, Mike Roselle, Bart Koehler, and Ron Kezar— as the group was driving home from the Pinacate Desert in Mexico.
- Died:
  - Red Sovine (Woodrow Wilson Sovine), 62, American country music singer and songwriter known for the "truck driver songs" "Teddy Bear" and "Phantom 309", from a heart attack and subsequent crash while driving in Nashville.
  - Aleksander Ford (stage name for Mosze Lifszyc), 71, Polish film director who had fallen into disfavor with Poland's Communist government and fled to the U.S. in 1968, killed himself in Miami.

== April 5, 1980 (Saturday) ==
- The long-running American police drama Hawaii Five-O came to an end after 12 seasons and 279 episodes. In the series finale, Honolulu police detective Steve McGarrett (portrayed by actor Jack Lord was finally able to capture his archenemy, Wo Fat (played by Khigh Dhiegh), who had been introduced on the first episode on September 20, 1968.
- What would become the band R.E.M. was created as lead vocalist Michael Stipe, guitarist Peter Buck, drummer Bill Berry and bassist Mike Mills played their first show together, for a birthday party for their friend Kathleen O'Brien at an Episcopal church in Athens, Georgia. Two weeks later, they first performed under the R.E.M. name at the Coffee Club 11-11 in Athens on April 19.

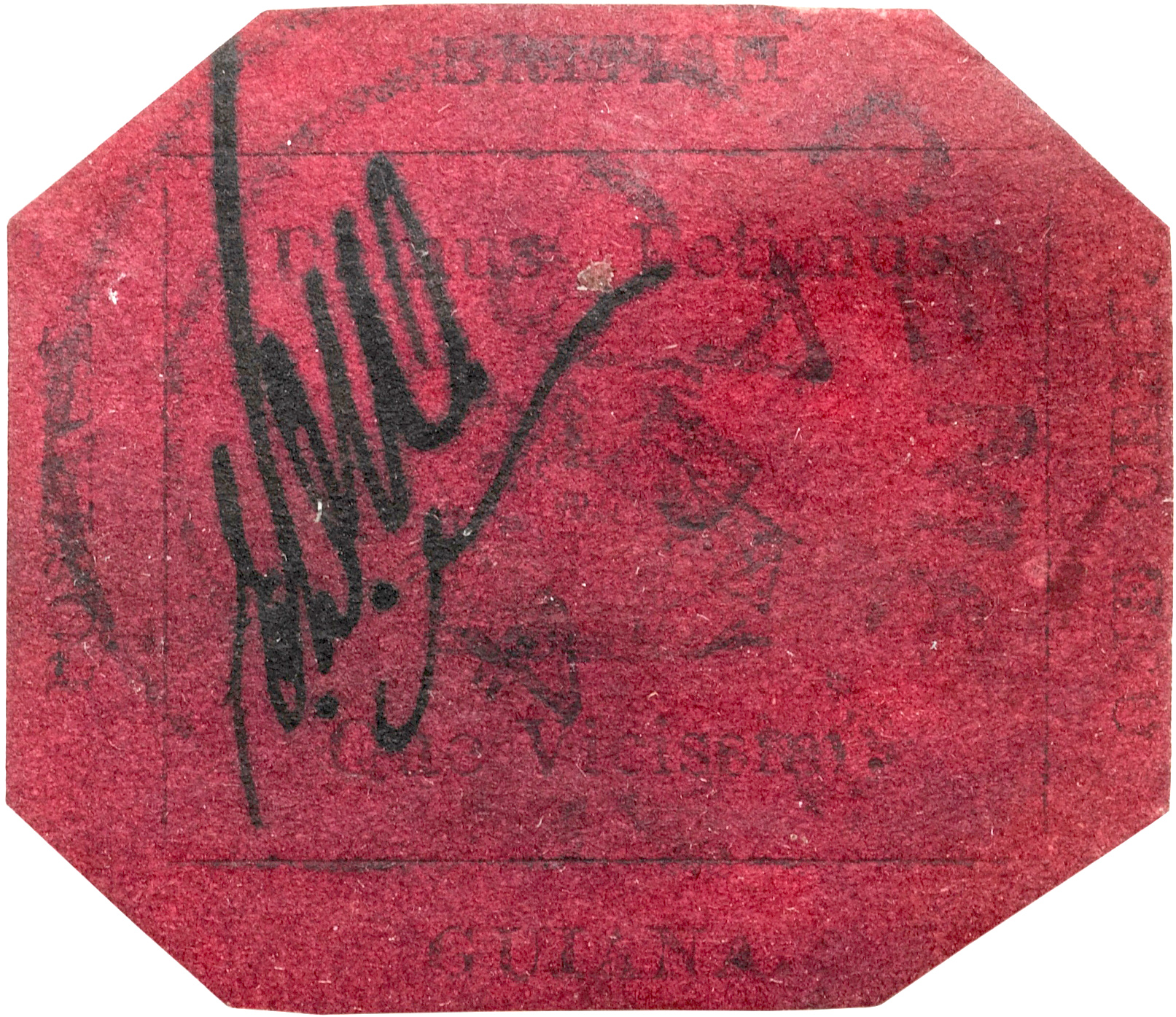
The British Guiana magenta

- A then-record price for a postage stamp— U.S. $850,000— was paid at an auction by an unidentified bidder for the British Guiana 1c magenta. The one-cent stamp, issued by British Guiana (now Guyana) in 1856, had set the previous record of $280,000 when it was purchased in 1970 by a nine-member syndicate headed by dealer Irwin Weinberg. On June 17, 2014, Weinberg's syndicate would resell the stamp for US$9,480,000. In 2020 dollars, the progression of the price paid was $1,900,000 (1970), $2,700,000 (1980) and $10,266,000 (2014).

== April 6, 1980 (Sunday) ==
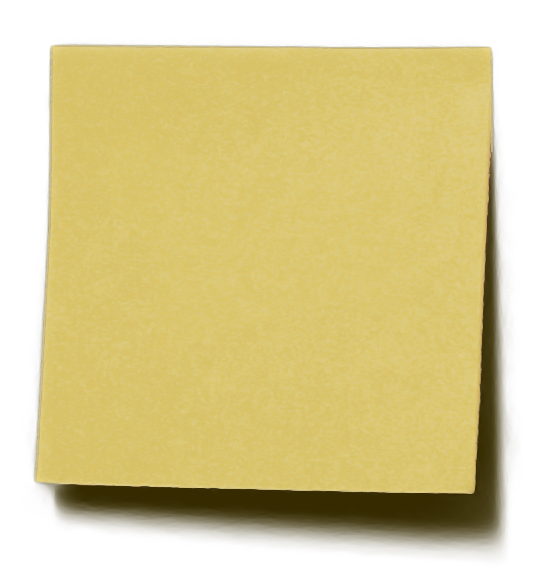
Post-it notes

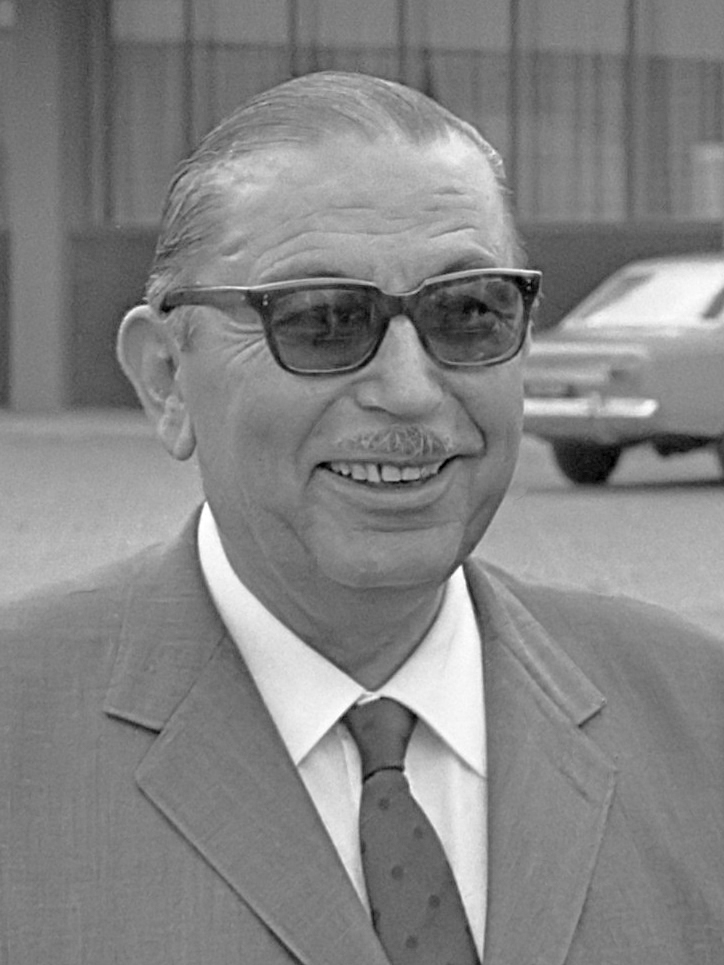
Caglayangil

- Post-it Notes, invented by 3M scientist Spencer Silver and promoter Art Fry, went on sale for the first time in the United States as a product of the 3M Company. In 1978, the product had been test marketed as "Press 'n' Peel pads".
- İhsan Sabri Çağlayangil became the Acting President of Turkey upon the expiration of the 7-year term of Fahri Korutürk, who left office without a president-elect to take over. Turkey's Parliament, which was required to elect the president by a two-thirds majority vote of the 635 combined members of both houses, had yet to have a candidate nominated by any of the political parties. Secret ballots had been taken to test the viability of individuals who might be advanced by one of the parties, but a nominee was not put forward until April 10 and was unable to secure even a 50 percent majority. While the joint session kept balloting, Çağlayangil was authorized to act in his capacity as leader of the Republican Senate. He would serve until a coup d'etat on September 12.
- An Easter service was allowed to be held for the 50 U.S. Embassy personnel being held hostage in Tehran, conducted by three American members of the clergy who were permitted to meet with the hostages and report about their condition. Two Methodist ministers, Nelson Thompson and Jack Bremer, and Roman Catholic priest Darrell Rupiper conducted services along with Hilarion Capudji, the Melkite Greek Catholic Patriarch of Jerusalem.
- Born:
  - Khalid bin Sultan Al Qasimi, Emirati fashion designer and a member of United Arab Emirates royalty who founded the Qasimi Homme clothing store chain in Britain; in Sharjah (died of drug overdose, 2019)
  - Margarita Simonyan, Armenian Russian journalist and chief editor for the Russian international news agency Rossiya Segodnya and for Russia's RT television network; in Krasnodar, Russian SFSR, Soviet Union
  - Bardish Chagger, Canadian politician and Leader of the Government in the House of Commons from 2016 to 2019; in Waterloo, Ontario
- Died: John Collier, 78, British fiction and screenplay writer known for his stories of fantasy

== April 7, 1980 (Monday) ==
- The United States severed diplomatic relations with Iran and imposed additional economic sanctions, after the Ayatollah Khomeini rejected any plan to transfer the U.S. Embassy hostages from the control of students to the custody of the Iranian government. Carter ordered all of Iran's diplomats to leave the country before the end of Tuesday, sent United States marshals to close all Iranian consulates, prohibited any additional Iranian citizens from entering the U.S., and barred almost all American exports to Iran. Prior to Carter's announcement, U.S. State Department official Henry Precht, director of the department's Office of Iranian Affairs, summoned Iran's charge d'affaires, Ali Agah, to his office and presented him the expulsion orders requiring the remaining 35 diplomats to leave. Agah told reporters afterward that the staff had been "treated disrespectfully". When Agah's aide, Mohammed Lavassini, insisted that the Iranian government was providing protection to the American hostages, Precht angrily replied, "Bullshit!"
- The Misgav Am hostage crisis began when five members of the Arab Liberation Front seized an Israeli Jewish kibbutz in the occupied Golan Heights captured a group of children and held them hostage. The Sayeret Matkal special force team retook the kibbutz ten hours later.
- Died: Eloy "Buck" Canel, 74, Argentine-born American sportscaster who made Spanish language radio broadcasts from 1937 to 1979.

== April 8, 1980 (Tuesday) ==
- The first United States Women's World Bodybuilding Championship was held in Atlantic City, New Jersey, the traditional site for the Miss America beauty pageant. Thirty competitors were hosted by the Caesars Boardwalk Regency Hotel. Rachel McLish of Harlingen, Texas, was the winner of the first contest.
- Died: Michael T. Gottlieb, 79, American champion contract bridge player

== April 9, 1980 (Wednesday) ==
- The resettlement of Eniwetok Atoll began as 450 former residents were returned to the chain of 40 coral islands in the Marshall Islands, a United States territory. The residents departed on two ships from Majuro, where many of them had been living for 33 years. Eniwetok's people had been removed from Eniwetok by the United States in 1947 in order for U.S. to use the atoll for its atmospheric thermonuclear bomb tests. A three-year cleanup effort was conducted from 1977 to 1980 to make the atoll free of radioactivity from 43 nuclear tests, and for habitation to be constructed. At the same time, preparations were being made for other Eniwetok residents to be returned to their home after living for 33 years on the Ujelang Atoll.
- Soyuz 35 was launched with Soviet cosmonauts Leonid Popov and Valery Ryumin and docked with the unoccupied Salyut 6 space station. Popov and Ryumin spent more than six months in outer space as the "resident crew" and remained at the station until October 11, while other crews arrived and departed, including Valery Kubasov and Bertalan Farkas, who arrived on Soyuz 36 on May 26 and then returned on Soyuz 35 on July 31.
- A four-man active service unit of the Provisional IRA Belfast Brigade, nicknamed the "M60 unit", lured the Royal Ulster Constabulary (RUC) into an ambush on Stewarstown Road, killing Constable Stephen Magill and wounding two others.
- The Madison Square Garden Sports Network, which had launched on cable on September 22, 1977, was renamed the USA Network. On the same day, Madison Square Garden named its channel on New York's Sterling cable television as "Madison Square Garden Network", later abbreviated to MSG Network.
- Gordie Howe scored his final National Hockey League career goal, which had opened on October 16, 1946. Howe played in the NHL in five decades (40s, 50s, 60s, 70s and 80s), appearing in 1,767 NHL and 419 WHA games. His final goal was scored on April 9, 1980, in his penultimate game, for the Hartford Whalers in an 8-4 playoff loss to Montreal.
- Britain's Associated Television (ATV) network and ITV's regional channels broadcast a dramatization of the 1977 public execution of Saudi Arabian Princess Mishaal for adultery, Death of a Princess, leading to a protest by Saudi Arabia. By agreement between Britain's Foreign Office and ATV, a disclaimer was inserted at the beginning of the broadcast that said "We have been asked to point out that equality for all before the law is regarded as paramount in the Muslim world," in that the man who committed adultery with Princess Mishaal was also executed.
- Died: Muhammad Baqir al-Sadr, 45, Iraqi Shi'ite Muslim cleric and his sister Bint al-Huda al-Sadr, 42, opponents of the regime of Iraqi President Saddam Hussein, were executed in Najaf for their role in leading the Shia Muslim uprising against the Ba'ath Party.

== April 10, 1980 (Thursday) ==
- The governments of Spain and the United Kingdom agreed to reopen the border between Gibraltar and Spain in 1985, closed since 1969, at negotiations held in Portugal at Lisbon. British Foreign Secretary Lord Carrington and Spanish Foreign Minister Marcelino Oreja issued a joint announcement that a timetable for reopening would be agreed upon by June 1. The border would open to pedestrians on December 15, 1982 and to motor vehicles on February 5, 1985.
- Fighting between rival groups of Cambodian refugees in Thailand broke out at Camp 204, at the village Non Mark Moon near Thailand's border with Cambodia. During the day, 46 people were killed and 170 wounded in the camp of 60,000 Cambodians who had fled fighting in their country.
- A 1950 friendship treaty between the Soviet Union and the People's Republic of China expired after 30 years, with no plans to renew or renegotiate the agreement. The Communist governments of China and the U.S.S.R. had split over ideological differences during the Soviets' de-Stalinization period in the late 1950s. In 1979, China gave the one-year notice of intent not to renew the April 10, 1950 agreement.
- Born: Charlie Hunnam, English film and TV actor, star of the American TV series Sons of Anarchy; in Newcastle upon Tyne
- Died: Kay Medford, 60, American stage, film and TV actress

== April 11, 1980 (Friday) ==
- Mohammed Mustafa Ramadan, a Libyan reporter for BBC's Arabic Service, was shot and killed in London as he left prayer at the Regent's Park Mosque by two gunmen, Ben Hassan al-Masri and Nagib Mufta Gasmi. The death was the first after Libya's government newspaper, Green March, announced Muammar Gaddafi's campaign against expatriates who had fled Libya, whom it labeled as "stray dogs".
- Fridays, a late night live comedy variety show on ABC that copied NBC's Saturday Night Live, premiered at 9:30 in the evening in Los Angeles (11:30 Eastern time). The cast included Larry David and Michael Richards.
- Ice hockey legend Gordie Howe played his final game, bringing an end to a career that had started in 1939. Earlier in the year, he had become the first and only player to compete in the National Hockey League in five different decades (the 1940s, 1950s, 1960s, 1970s and 1980s). Howe's Hartford Whalers lost, 4 to 3, to the Montreal Canadiens and were eliminated from the Stanley Cup playoffs.
- Born:
  - Keiji Tamada, Japanese footballer with 78 caps for the Japan national team; in Urayasu, Chiba Prefecture
  - Mark Teixeira, American major league baseball first baseman who was 2009 American League home run and RBI leader; in Annapolis, Maryland
- Died:
  - Ümit Kaftancıoğlu, 44, Turkish journalist and TV producer, was murdered by a gunman outside of his home in Istanbul
  - Cynthia May Carver, 77, American country singer and pioneering female solo performer who adopted the stage name "Cousin Emmy"

== April 12, 1980 (Saturday) ==
Sergeant Doe

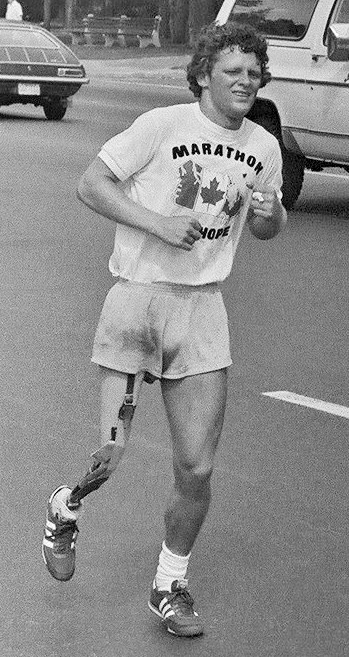
Terry Fox

- Master Sergeant Samuel K. Doe of the Liberian Army overthrew the government of Liberia in a violent coup d'état', ending over 130 years of democratic presidential succession and Americo-Liberians rule in that country. William Tolbert, President of Liberia since 1971, was shot and killed by Sergeant Harrison Pennoh at the Presidential Mansion in Monrovia. Master Sgt. Doe, age 28, became the new President as chairman of the National Redemption Council. He gave a 12-minute speech and pledged "a new society without discrimination" between the privileged descendants of former American slaves and the descendants of area natives. "Gone forever are the days of 'Who do you know,' and 'Do you know who I am?' Doe said. "We now enter a time of 'What can you do?'". He added that "Privilege had held down our people too long." Another 26 surviving members of Tolbert's cabinet and staff were arrested, tried and executed 10 days later. Liberia's Vice President, Bennie Warner, was spared the carnage because he was in the United States, attending a conference of United Methodist Church ministers in Nashville, Indiana.
- Fifty-five of the 58 people board Transbrasil Flight 303 were killed when the Boeing 727 crashed into a mountain as it approached the airport in Florianópolis in Brazil. The airliner impacted at 8:38 in the evening partway through the end of a three-stop flight from São Paulo.
- The United States Olympic Committee (USOC) House of Delegates voted, 1,604 to 797, in favor of U.S. President Carter's request to boycott the 1980 Summer Olympics in Moscow. The vote came at the USOC meeting in Colorado Springs, Colorado.
- Terry Fox began his Marathon of Hope, a plan to run from one side of Canada to the other, starting at St. Johns in Newfoundland. Fox, who had a prosthetic right leg after an amputation for cancer in 1977, had decided to make the cross-Canada run as a fundraiser for the Canadian Cancer Society.
- Born: Brian McFadden, Irish singer and songwriter for Westlife and later as a solo artist; in Dublin
- Died:
  - Clark McConachy, 84, New Zealand World Professional Billiards Champion from 1951 until 1968
  - Stanley de Silva, 23, Sri Lanka national team cricketer, was killed in a motorcycle accident at Balapitiya.

== April 13, 1980 (Sunday) ==
- The musical Grease gave its final performance on Broadway, after 3,388 performances that had started at the Broadhurst Theatre on June 7, 1972 and closed at the Majestic Theatre.
- On the occasion of the start of the new year on Nepal's lunar calendar, King Birendra announced a general amnesty for all political prisoners and exiles, estimated to number between 250 and 300 people.
- Environmentalist Barry Commoner was nominated by for the 1980 U.S. presidential election as a third party candidate for the liberal Citizens Party at its convention in Cleveland. Commoner and his running mate, LaDonna Harris, would finish fifth in the popular vote with 233,052 votes.
- Days after his 23rd birthday, Spanish professional golfer Seve Ballesteros became the youngest winner of the Masters Tournament.
- Died: Karl Stegger, 67, prolific Danish film and TV actor who appeared in 157 movies during a 30-year career

== April 14, 1980 (Monday) ==
- India's Prime Minister Indira Gandhi narrowly missed an assassination attempt in New Delhi when a man threw a stiletto at her from only 6 feet (1.8 m) away. The six-inch knife grazed one of her bodyguards but Gandhi was uninjured.
- At the 52nd Academy Awards, Kramer vs. Kramer won the Oscar for Best Picture, and its star, Dustin Hoffman won the award for Best Actor, and Sally Field was awarded Best Actress for the title role in Norma Rae.
- The heavy metal group Iron Maiden released its first album, the self-titled album Iron Maiden, in the United Kingdom.
- Born: Win Butler, American-Canadian musician, lead singer of Arcade Fire, as Edwin Farnham Butler III in Truckee, California

== April 15, 1980 (Tuesday) ==
- U.S. Secretary of State Cyrus Vance argued with U.S. President Carter over the scheduled rescue attempt of Americans held hostage in Tehran. According to observers at the secret meeting, which took place because Vance had not been present at the April 11 gathering when Carter authorized the rescue, Vance said that diplomatic solutions hadn't been exhausted and that the attempt would likely result in a loss of life for some of the 50 hostages, not all of whom (including Bruce Laingen, the chargé d'affaires and ranking U.S. diplomat, who was being held at the Iranian Foreign Ministry rather than at the embassy). Vance also pointed out that there were other Americans living in Iran who could be taken hostage even if the diplomats were rescued. After U.S. Defense Secretary Harold Brown asked Vance, "When do you expect the hostages to be released?", and Vance had no answer, Carter reaffirmed his decision and Vance "tendered his resignation, to be effective after the mission had been completed."
- Photoplay magazine, established in 1911 as the first American news periodical for film fans, published its final issue. Since 1977, it had been known as Photoplay and TV Mirror.
- Born: Natalie Casey, English TV actress; in Rawtenstall, Lancashire
- Died:
  - Jean Paul Sartre, 74, French existentialist philosopher, playwright, novelist and screenwriter
  - Raymond Bailey, 75, American stage, film and TV actor known best for portraying "Mr. Drysdale" on The Beverly Hillbillies
  - Marshall Reed, 62, American film actor who appeared in 200 films and TV shows

== April 16, 1980 (Wednesday) ==
- Zhao Ziyang, disgraced during China's Cultural Revolution after being fired from his position as the Guangdong province chairman of the Chinese Communist Party, was elevated to the office of one of the Vice Premiers of the National People's Congress. Five months later, Zhao was appointed as Premier of the People's Republic of China and, 20 years after being paraded through the streets of Guangzhou and made to wear a dunce cap, was elevated to the top position as General Secretary of the CCP in 1987.
- Born: Muhammad Hassan, American school principal and former wrestler, as Marc Copani in Syracuse, New York
- Died: Verne Lewellen, 78, American pro football star and Green Bay Packers halfback from 1924 to 1932.

== April 17, 1980 (Thursday) ==
- U.S. President Carter issued Executive Order 12211, banning all travel by American citizens to Iran and halted all further imports, as well as forbidding financial transactions with Iran by anybody in the United States. Carter's authority on all the provisions was made pursuant to the International Emergency Economic Powers Act of 1977.
- Born:
  - Kiril Petkov, Prime Minister of Bulgaria since 2021; in Plovdiv
  - Lee Hyun-il, South Korean badminton star, in Seoul

== April 18, 1980 (Friday) ==
Zimbabwe Rhodesia's old flag

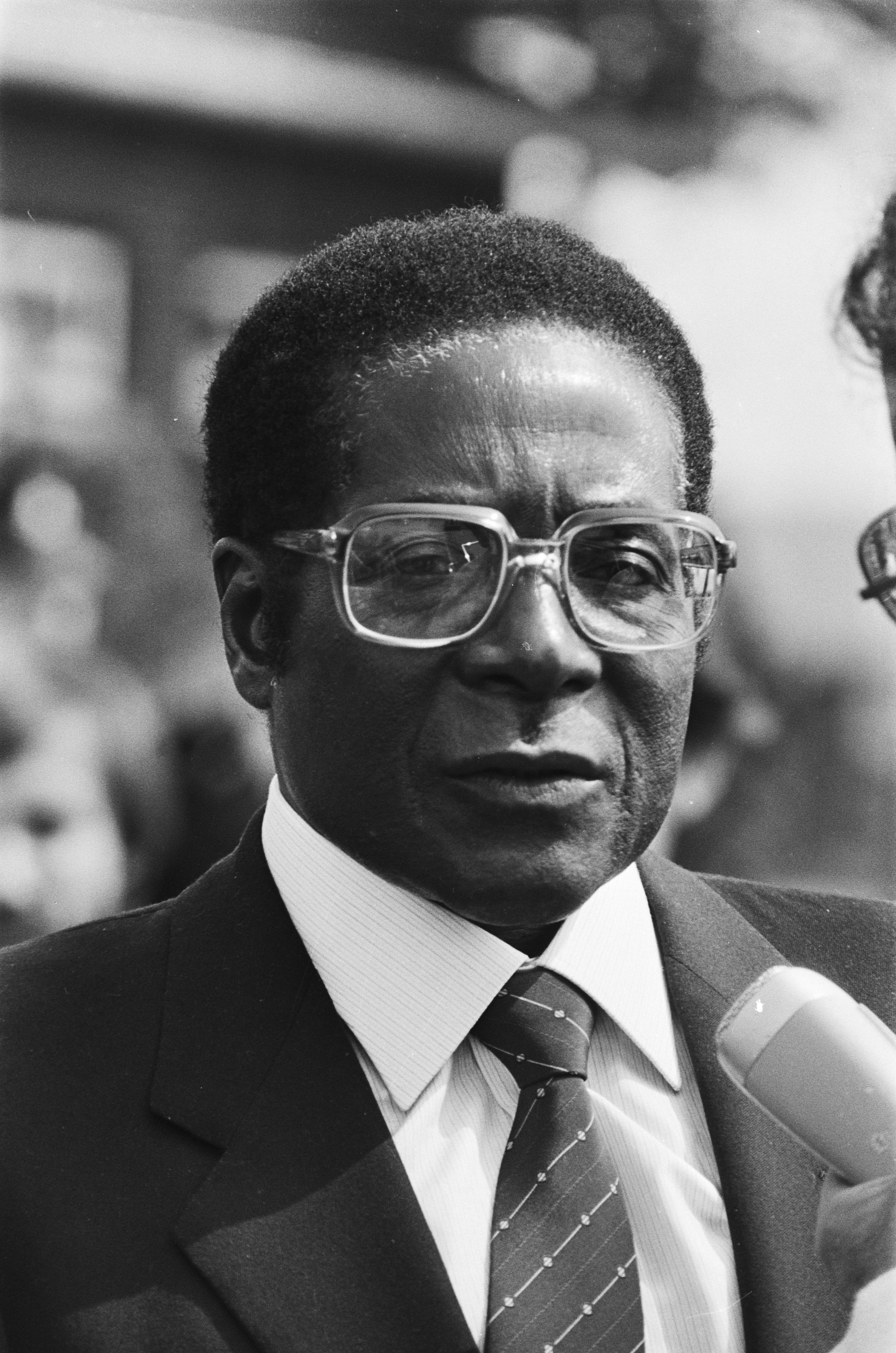
Prime Minister Mugabe

- Zimbabwe, formerly the white-minority ruled nation of Rhodesia, was granted independence from the United Kingdom. Robert Mugabe became the nation's Prime Minister.
- The Iranian Cultural Revolution began with an attack on the Teachers' Training College in Tehran, hours after the Ayatollah Khomeini's speech warning of the danger of "Western universities". In the days that followed, Khomeini's supporters staged attacks as the universities in Shiraz, Mashad, Isfahan, Ahwaz and Rasht. All universities in Iran were ordered closed on June 12.
- The rare cactus species Mammillaria berkiana was discovered by biologist Alfred Bernhard Lau near the village of San Andrés Cohamiata in Mexico's Jalisco state. By 1994 only 5,000 would be left and only 100 by the end of the century. It is now considered not to be a distinct species, but a synonym of Mammillaria mercadensis.
- The government of Puerto Rico, which had its own Olympic team despite being a Commonwealth within the United States, announced that it would compete in the 1980 Summer Olympics in Moscow, despite the boycott by the U.S.; the Puerto Rican team members became the only U.S. citizens to participate in the Olympics in 1980.
- Born:
  - Brenda Villa, American water polo player and gold medalist in the Olympics (2012), World Championships (2003-2009), and the FINA World League competition (2004-2012); in Los Angeles
  - Justin Amash, former U.S. Congressman for Michigan and Palestinian Christian; in Grand Rapids, Michigan
- Died: Antonio Caponigro, 68, Mafia consigliere who had planned the March 21 murder of Philadelphia crime boss Angelo Bruno, was killed along with his brother-in-law Alfred Salerno after being summoned before "The Commission" (the unofficial governing body of the Bonanno, Colombo, Gambino, Genovese, and Lucchese crime families in New York City) for an unauthorized murder.

== April 19, 1980 (Saturday) ==
- A fleet of 50 lobster boats departed from Miami to bring Cuban refugees back to the United States, after Fidel Castro announced that thousands of Cubans, receiving asylum at the Peruvian Embassy in Havana, were welcome to leave. "Of course," the Cuban government newspaper Granma reported, "we will not receive them with cannon fire because they are coming in peace... We don't mind that they take the refugees away."
- The body of Jeanette Woods, the first of six prostitutes murdered in Detroit in 1980 in similar fashion, was found. Donald Murphy was arrested two days after attempting to kill a seventh woman, and would confess to the six murders, but only tried and convicted for the last two killings.
- Shayetet 13 Israeli commandos carrying out Operation Meta'h Gavoha (High Voltage), raided the base of a guerrilla organization in southern Lebanon that was believed to be planning an attack on a community in Israel, killing about 15 guerrillas, including the commander of the infiltration unit and two of its members.
- Born: Mayko Nguyen, Canadian film and TV actress; in Vancouver

== April 20, 1980 (Sunday) ==
- The strike by the United Auto Workers against the International Harvester Company, the UAW's longest national strike, ended after 172 days. On November 1, 1979, the 35,000 UAW workers at 21 IH plants in eight states walked off of the job.
- Voters in Honduras turned out for the first election since 1971 in the Central American nation. The voters were choosing among candidates for the 71-member National Assembly, which had been suspended during the nine years that Honduras was governed by different military regimes.
- An alert television viewer in Ojai, California, watching golf's MONY Tournament of Champions on TV, called the Professional Golfers Association after seeing that golfer Tom Watson had broken one of the rules of the sport by giving advice to another player, Lee Trevino. Despite being penalized with the addition of strokes to his score, Watson won the 72-hole tournament and its prize of $54,000. Afterward, Watson, who co-authored the United States Golf Association rules manual, joked later, "I hope that man in Ojai got his information from my book."
- Born:
  - Waylon (stage name for Willem Bijkerk), Netherlands country music singer; in Apeldoorn
  - Vibeke Skofterud, Norwegian cross country skier, 2010 Olympic and 2005 and 2011 World Championship gold medalist; in Askim (d. 2018)
- Died:
  - Katherine Kennicott Davis, 87, American composer who wrote the popular Christmas song "The Little Drummer Boy" as "The Carol of the Drum" in 1941
  - Helmut Käutner, 72, German film director

== April 21, 1980 (Monday) ==
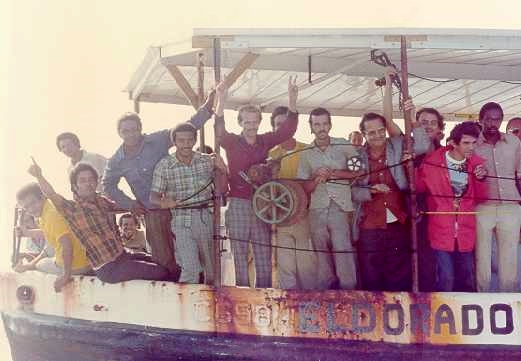
A group of Cuban refugees

- The Mariel boatlift began as 48 Cuban refugees were allowed to leave the Cuban port of Mariel and sailed to Key West, Florida the same day. Chartered by Frank Soto and other Florida businessmen who had fled the Castro regime, the boats Dos Hermanos and Blanche III made the 120 mi (190 km) trip from Key West to Mariel, not sure what to expect. Soto told reporters, "The boats had no problem. They went directly to Mariel." Although other boats had departed the day before, Dos Hermanos and Blanche III were the first to bring back new passengers. Between April 21 and October 31, almost 125,000 Marielitos would take advantage of the chance to leave Fidel Castro's Cuba.
- Iran ceased all shipments of its oil to Japan, after the Japanese government rejected a National Iranian Oil Company's abrupt increase in the price from $32.50 to $35.00 per barrel. The sudden reduction of 10% of the oil available to Japan triggered a vote of no confidence that brought down the government of Japanese Prime Minister Masayoshi Ohira.
- The students holding the U.S. Embassy staff hostage in Iran permitted the first visit by a relative of any of the hostages. Barbara Timm of Oak Creek, Wisconsin, the mother of U.S. Marine Sergeant Kevin J. Hermening, was allowed to meet with her son for 45 minutes after traveling to Tehran.
- Rosie Ruiz crossed the finish line first among women in the Boston Marathon. Her time for running the 26 mile, 385 yard course was 25 minutes faster than her reported finish in the New York City Marathon in October, and observers noted that she wasn't fatigued or heavily perspiring after reaching the finish line. Ruiz was stripped of the title on April 29 and Jacqueline Gareau of Canada was declared the winner of the women's field, having completed the race in 2 hours, 34 minutes and 28 seconds. The overall winner was Bill Rodgers of the United States, who won his third consecutive Boston Marathon with a time of 2:12:11.
- A plot to destroy an El Al airliner in mid-flight was foiled when Israeli security agents at the Zürich airport seized a German citizen who had a time bomb that had been placed in his carry-on luggage. The bomb was timed to explode while the El Al was flying over the Mediterranean Sea to Tel Aviv.
- Born:
  - Vincent Lecavalier, Canadian NHL star for 17 seasons, primarily for the Tampa Bay Lightning; the NHL's top scorer in 2007 and 2004 Olympic gold medalist; in L'Île-Bizard, Quebec
  - Tony Romo (Antonio Ramiro Romo), American NFL quarterback for the Dallas Cowboys for 14 seasons; in San Diego
- Died:
  - Alexander Oparin, 86, Soviet Russian biochemist
  - Sohrab Sepehri, 51, Iranian poet

== April 22, 1980 (Tuesday) ==
- A collision killed 133 passengers and crew when the Philippine ferry MV Don Juan sailed into the path of the oil tanker MT Tacloban City and was sliced in half. Carrying 862 passengers and a crew of 88, the inter-island ferry had departed Manila on a 300 mi (480 km) trip to Bacolod and was near the island of Maestre de Campo when the collision occurred. MT Tacloban City and another ferry, MV Laoag City, were close enough to rescue survivors from the 1,800 ft (550 m) deep waters of the shark-infested Tablas Strait.
- In the aftermath of the coup d'etat by indigenous Liberians against the Americo-Liberian civil servants descended from African-American immigrants, 13 prominent government officials were publicly executed by firing squad at a beach near Monrovia. Put to death following a show trial were the four defendants given death sentences, Senate President Frank E. Tolbert, Supreme Court Chief Justice James A. A. Pierre, Speaker of the House Richard A. Henries, and the Chairman of the ruling True Whig Party, E. Reginald Townsend. Seven other government officials were acquitted on some of the charges of treason and corruption, and sentenced to life imprisonment— then executed anyway. The additional dead were Foreign Minister Cecil Dennis and the Ministers of Agriculture, Trade, Finance, Planning and Justice, as well as the treasurer of the True Whig Party.
- Died:
  - Fritz Strassmann, 78, German chemist and physicist who was the co-discoverer of the principle of nuclear fission; winner of the 1966 Enrico Fermi Award
  - Jane Froman, 72, American singer and actress whose return to acting after an airplane crash was profiled in the film With a Song in My Heart

== April 23, 1980 (Wednesday) ==
- For the first time since the Iranian Revolution of 1979 brought the Ayatollah Khomeini to power, anti-government protesters took to the streets in Tehran in the wake of student rioting that had killed scores of civilians in the provinces. Western reporters noted the posting of banners that said "Death to Khomeini" and the shouting of slogans against President Banisadr.
- Born:
  - Małgorzata Socha, Poland TV actress; in Warsaw
  - Griffon Ramsey, American chainsaw carving artist; in Eugene, Oregon

== April 24, 1980 (Thursday) ==
- The Pennsylvania State Lottery was rigged, with the help of the host of the nightly drawing, Nick Perry, as part of a conspiracy of six men who put extra weight on one of the ping pong balls in each of the drawing tumblers. After multiple nightly drawings of the Daily Lottery with no winner, the lottery jackpot had reached a record high, and the three digits drawn on pick 3 — 666, associated with the Biblical Number of the Beast — yielded a record jackpot of $3,502,425. The Pennsylvania government initially concluded on April 29 that the lottery was impossible to fix, by June, a grand jury was called to investigate. Film of the April 24 drawing showed that "In all three tumblers, the two lively balls appeared to be the balls marked '6' and '4'," and much higher than average wager on the numbers 666, 444, 446, 464, 466, 644, 646 and 664. Perry and five other people were indicted on September 19.
- Western bankers and officials of Poland's government conferred at a meeting at the Hotel Victoria in Warsaw to discuss additional loans. The bankers made it clear that before it could borrow more money, Poland would have to stop its subsidy to maintain artificially low prices on consumer goods. On July 1, the Polish government announced a system of gradual but continuous price rises, particularly for meat, triggering the series of strikes that would lead to government recognition of the Solidarity Movement.
- U.S. Representative John B. Anderson of Illinois, who had dropped out of the race for the Republican presidential nomination, announced that he would run for office as a third party candidate.
- Born:
  - Karen Asrian, Armenian chess grandmaster; in Yerevan, Armenian SSR, Soviet Union (died of heart attack, 2008)
  - Reagan Gomez-Preston, American TV actress (The Parent 'Hood) and animation voice actress (The Cleveland Show); in Detroit
  - Austin Nichols, American TV actor known for The Walking Dead and for One Tree Hill
- Died: Alejo Carpentier, 75, Swiss-born Cuban novelist

== April 25, 1980 (Friday) ==
- Desert One, a commando mission in Iran to rescue American embassy hostages, was aborted after a sandstorm and mechanical problems grounded one of the rescue helicopters. As one of the remaining copters was attempting to lift off from the landing site at Desert One, it collided with a transport plane, killing eight U.S. troops. The pilot of one of the RH-53 Sea Stallion helicopters was attempting "one of the most routine maneuvers in helicopter flying— a short repositioning hop of a few hundred yards" when one of the rotor blades sliced through the C-130 transport, setting both aircraft on fire. Moments later, ammunition and explosives on both the C-130 and the RH-53 exploded.
- All 146 people aboard Dan-Air Flight 1008, from Manchester to Tenerife, crashed into a mountain on the Canary Island, La Esperanza, while in a holding pattern awaiting landing. A navigational error led to the pilot to begin circling over a mountainous area where the minimum safe altitude was 14,500 feet (4,400 m). Without noting that the Boeing 727 was in the wrong area to begin circling, the air traffic controller cleared Flight 1008 to descend to 5,000 feet (1,500 m). Upon realizing the error, the pilot attempted to climb to a higher altitude but struck the mountain at 1:21 in the afternoon local time at 5,453 feet (1,662 m).
- Aspiring writer and cartoonist Matt Groening was published for the first time when his comic strip Life in Hell was printed in an alternative weekly newspaper, the Los Angeles Reader. Groening's strip attracted the attention of TV producer James L. Brooks, who asked Groening to adapt his comic strip characters to animation for segments of Brooks's production of The Tracey Ullman Show in 1987. Rather than surrendering ownership of his comic strip, Groening sketched out a different set of characters who would be featured, starting in 1990, on a fully-animated comedy, The Simpsons.
- Born:
  - Daniel MacPherson, Australian TV, stage and film actor in Sydney
  - Samuel Barnett, English TV and radio actor; in Whitby, North Yorkshire
  - Lee Spick, English professional snooker player; in Mansfield, Nottinghamshire (d. 2015)

== April 26, 1980 (Saturday) ==
- After the failure of the U.S. attempt to rescue the 50 American hostages in the United States Embassy, the students holding the group announced that the hostages would be dispersed to various locations in order to prevent any further attempts at a raid.
- Leland Jensen, leader of a small apocalyptic cult, led followers into fallout shelters in Missoula, Montana, three days before the expected fulfillment of his prophecy that on April 29 a nuclear holocaust would take place at 5:55 PM. The following week another member of the sect, Charles Gaines, told reporters that the prediction of a holocaust for April 29 had failed because of a misinterpretation of Biblical time references. Jensen revised his forecast for the end of the world to May 7, predicting that the nuclear war would begin between 6:00 and 8:00 in the morning.
- Born:
  - Channing Tatum, American film actor known for the Magic Mike films; in Cullman, Alabama
  - Jordana Brewster, Panamanian-born American TV actress, in Panama City
  - Marlon King, English footballer and striker with 24 caps for the Jamaica national football team; in Dulwich, London
- Died: Dame Cicely Courtneidge, 87, Australian-born British stage actress and comedian

== April 27, 1980 (Sunday) ==
- The Dominican embassy siege in Colombia ended with the M-19 guerrillas releasing four hostages being allowed to fly to Cuba, where their 12 remaining hostages were released. The Colombian M-19 group had invaded a diplomatic reception at the Dominican Republic embassy in Bogotá and initially had taken 57 hostages on February 27.
- The crash of Thai Airways Flight 231 killed 44 of the 53 people on board, after the Hawker Siddeley HS 748 encountered a downdraft at 1,500 feet (460 m) while approaching Bangkok in a thunderstorm. The airplane had departed Khon Kaen 40 minutes earlier and was scheduled to land at 7:00 in the morning local time. A subsequent investigation concluded that the pilot had failed to use the plane's weather radar and had not tuned the radio to the weather warning frequency before making the decision to fly into a rapidly moving thunderstorm.
- The Itumbiara Dam hydroelectric power plant began generating electricity, providing electricity for the first time to much of the Paranaíba River valley Goiás state of Brazil.
- U.S. Secretary of State Cyrus Vance resigned in protest after having unsuccessfully tried to dissuade President Carter from launching the failed hostage rescue attempt.
- The Sea Shepherd Conservation Society took the first militant anti-whaling action in Spain, using mines to sink two whaling boats of Spain's only whaling company, Industria Ballenera SA (IBSA). Ibsa I and Ibsa II were sunk in the harbor at the Spanish port of Vigo in the Atlantic Ocean.
- Died:
  - Mario Bava, 65, Italian cinematographer and film director known for horror and macabre movies, including Operazione Paura, released in the U.S. as Kill, Baby, Kill
  - Dr. Nicolas Jaeger, 33, French mountaineer disappeared while attempting to climb, without bottled oxygen, the 8,383 m (27,503 ft) high mountain Lhotse Shar, on record as having the highest fatality rate in attempted climbs for mountains of 8,000 meters or higher. Dr. Jaeger had last been seen alive at the 8,200 m (26,900 ft) level, where he was photographed from a distance, before the view of him was obscured by a cloud bank.
  - Antoni Głowacki, 70, Polish fighter pilot for Britain's Royal Air Force during World War II.
  - John Culshaw, 55, English classical music record producer; from hepatitis

== April 28, 1980 (Monday) ==
- In the Sokoto State of Nigeria, police fired guns into a crowd of people protesting the inundation of their land from construction of the Bakolori Dam of the Sokoto River for an irrigation project. At least 25 people and perhaps as many as 380 were killed in the attack. Sokoto's Governor, Shehu Kangiwa, had previously promised demonstrators that he would address their concerns.
- Born: Kian Egan, Irish singer and songwriter for Westlife; in Sligo, Connacht
- Died: Thomas "Tex" Settle, U.S. aviator who set the world altitude record of 61,000 feet (19,000 m) in 1933

== April 29, 1980 (Tuesday) ==
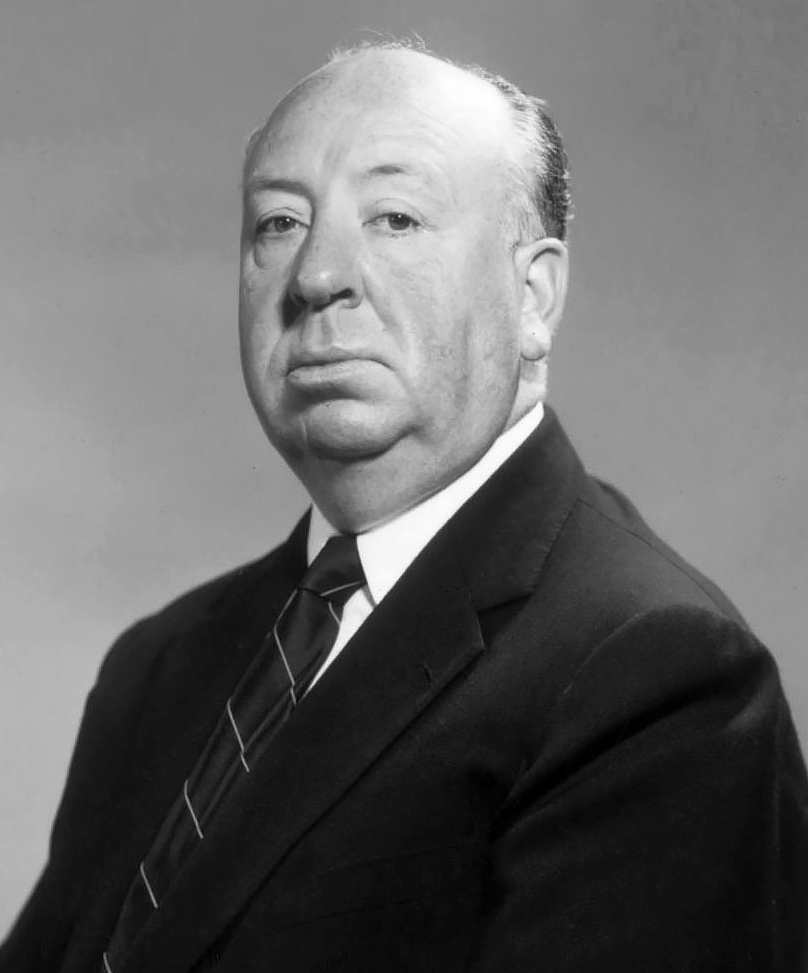
Alfred Hitchcock

- With 200,000 people attending on the park grounds of the National Mall, Washington for Jesus, the largest religious demonstration in the U.S. up to that time, was held.
- Senator Edmund Muskie of Maine was nominated by President Carter to be the new U.S. Secretary of State.
- Born: Emmad Irfani, Pakistani TV actor, in Peshawar
- Died: Alfred Hitchcock, 80, English-film director known as "The Master of Suspense"

== April 30, 1980 (Wednesday) ==
- The Iranian embassy in London was taken over by three armed men, who demanded that Iran release 91 prisoners held in the province of Khuzistan. At 11:30 in the morning, the group, calling itself the Democratic Revolutionary Movement for the Liberation of Arabistan entered the compound and took 26 hostages. After the group killed a hostage, Britain's SAS retook the Embassy on May 5, freeing the hostages and killing five of the six terrorists.
- While a crowd of protesters rioted outside of the Nieuwe Kerk in Amsterdam, Queen Beatrix acceded to the throne of the Netherlands after her mother, Queen Juliana, signed the instrument of abdication. Beatrix swore her allegiance to the Constitution of the Netherlands as part of the traditional investiture ceremony rather than a coronation, in accordance with a long standing tradition that no crown was placed on a monarch's head. At least 110 protesters, and 90 Amsterdam policemen, were injured in rioting by a group calling for the abolition of the Dutch monarchy. Juliana had ascended the throne on September 4, 1948 after the abdication of her mother, Queen Wilhelmina. Beatrix would abdicate exactly 33 years later, on April 30, 2013, and her son would become King Willem-Alexander of the Netherlands.
- Digging beneath the Suez Canal for the Ahmed Hamdi Tunnel was completed as Egypt's President Anwar Sadat pressed a button to set off explosives beneath the two sides to launch the first underground link between mainland Egypt and the Sinai Peninsula.
- The Basij, one of the five forces of the Islamic Revolutionary Guard Corps, was formally organized as a paramilitary volunteer militia established in Iran following the November 26, 1979 by order of the Ayatollah Khomeini, consisted of civilian volunteers who were prepared to fight against Iraq.
- Barnum, a Broadway musical production based on the life of circus showman P. T. Barnum, premiered at the St. James Theatre for the first of 854 performances. With lyrics by Michael Stewart and music by Cy Coleman, the play included jugglers, trapeze artists, clowns, and other circus performers. It won three Tony Awards, including one for Jim Dale for his performance of the title role, and the first Tony Award nomination for Glenn Close.
- Born:
  - Luis Scola, Argentine professional basketball forward and gold medalist for the Argentine Olympic team in 2004; in Buenos Aires
  - Akhdiyat Duta Modjo, American-born Indonesian pop music singer; in Lexington, Kentucky
- Died: Luis Muñoz Marín, 82, the first elected Governor of Puerto Rico. He served four consecutive terms from 1949 to 1965.
