= May 1980 =

Month of 1980

<<	May 1980					>>
Su	Mo	Tu	We	Th	Fr	Sa
				1	2	3
4	5	6	7	8	9	10
11	12	13	14	15	16	17
18	19	20	21	22	23	24
25	26	27	28	29	30	31

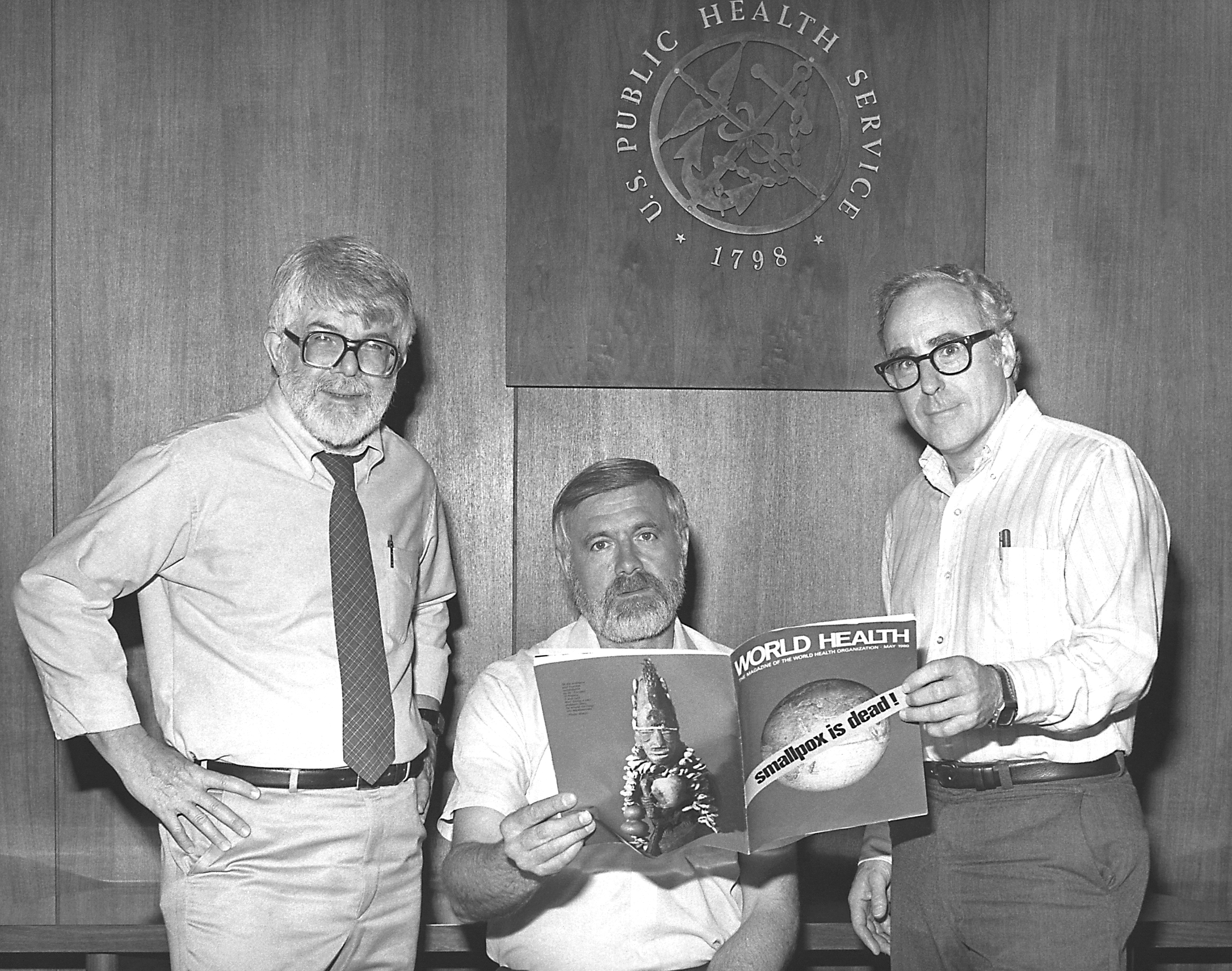
May 8, 1980: Eradication of smallpox announced by World Health Organization

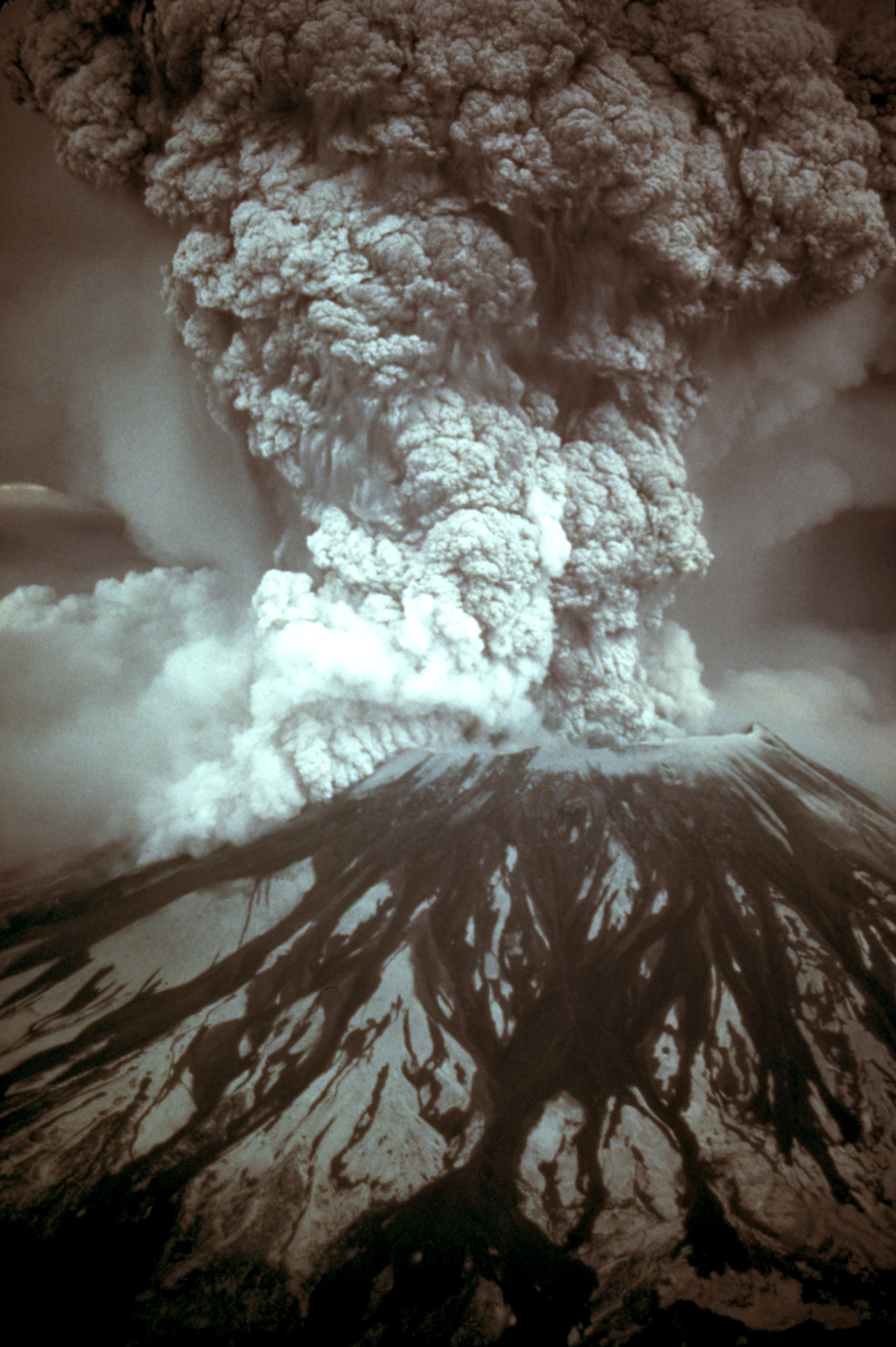
May 18, 1980: Mount St. Helens volcano erupts, kills 57 Americans

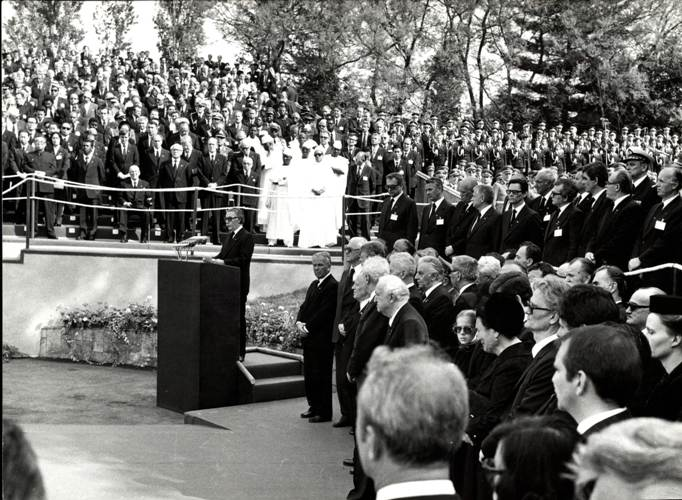
May 8, 1980: The world's leaders appear for Josip Broz Tito's funeral

The following events took place in May 1980:

== May 1, 1980 (Thursday) ==
- The first U.S. government shutdown for lack of funding took place as the U.S. Federal Trade Commission ceased operations. A total of 1,600 workers were furloughed, and meetings and court dates were canceled. The shutdown ended that evening, with the House approving a $7.6 million extension of funding 284–96, and the Senate 71–10. The shutdown was estimated to cost $700,000, of which $600,000 was for salaries.
- "About that urban renaissance.... there'll be a slight delay", an article by journalist Dan Rottenberg in Chicago magazine, contained the first recorded use of the word "yuppie" to refer to a "young urban professional". Referring to the migration of renters and buyers to Chicago from its suburbs, Rottenberg wrote "Some 20,000 new dwelling units have been built within two miles of the Loop over the past ten years to accommodate the rising tide of “Yuppies"—young urban professionals rebelling against the stodgy suburban lifestyles of their parents."
- Pacific Southwest Airlines Flight 818 was hijacked shortly after taking off from Stockton, California for Los Angeles. The hijacker, from Ceres scaled a fence at the Stockton Municipal Airport, then ran across the grounds to where stairs had been lowered for the outside boarding of the Boeing 727. He then held one hostage, PSA flight engineer Alan Romatowski, at gunpoint for six hours until Romatowski overpowered and disarmed him. The hijacker's father said that his 25-year old son had written a screenplay about "a young man hijacking an airplane, kidnapping a senator, flying to Iran and kidnapping the Ayatollah in order to get the hostages back to the U.S. safely". After being convicted in November by a jury that rejected his defense of temporary insanity, the hijacker was sentenced to 15 years imprisonment, with the provision that he would receive psychiatric treatment until federal parole officers determined that he could be released.
- "Pick Six" betting, the first large-jackpot wagering game in the United States, was introduced for horse race betting, based on the daily races at the Hollywood Park Racetrack in Inglewood, California. Under a format similar to a long-operating program at Mexico's Agua Caliente Racetrack in Tijuana, a bettor could by a Pick Six betting card for two-dollars to choose the winners for six consecutive races (the third through eighth races at Hollypark), or pay $128 for picking two possibilities for the winners of six races, with all combinations priced under formula of $2 x n^{6}, with n being the number of possibilities. The people who picked the most winners out of six races would split 75% of the pool of Pick Six purchases. Seventeen bettors received $8,491 apiece for picking all six winners in the first day of Pick Six.
- Died: Henry Levin, 70, American film director, died of a heart attack while directing the television film, Scout's Honor.

== May 2, 1980 (Friday) ==
- A referendum on system of government was held in Nepal, the first voting in 22 years. Voters decided to keep the panchayat political system that had prevailed since 1962, when an indirectly elected legislature, the Rastriya Panchayat, was created to advise King Mahendra. Votes were made by stamping the ballot blue (for the restoration of political parties) or yellow (for retaining the panchayat system).
- The U.S. Fifth Circuit Court of Appeals issued its decision in Amstar Corp. v. Domino's Pizza, Inc, 617 F.2d 295, reversing a lower court decision that had ruled that Domino's Pizza would have to change its name so as not to infringe the trademark of Domino Sugar. While the suit was in progress, new franchises for the pizza restaurant carried the name "Pizza Dispatch".
- One-quarter of Sweden's workers went on strike, or were locked out by employers, after the 2,200,000 member Trade Unions Confederation (Landsorganisationen i Sverige or LO) was unable to reach an agreement with the Swedish Employers Association (Svenska Arbetsgivareföreningen) on wage increases.
- Died: Special Air Service Captain Herbert Westmacott, 28, was shot and killed while he and seven other SAS members were capturing a unit of four members of the Provisional Irish Republican Army, Paul Magee, Joe Doherty, Angelo Fusco, and Robert Campbell, who had taken over a house on Antrim Road. On June 11, 1981, the four IRA gunmen would escape from Crumlin Road Jail and perpetrate additional crimes.

== May 3, 1980 (Saturday) ==
- Genuine Risk became the second female winner in the history of the Kentucky Derby, and the first since Regret won in 1915, as the filly finished in first place against a field of 12 colts.
- An explosion at a fireworks factory killed at least 40 of the workers, mostly women and children, and severely injured 11 more, at the city of Mandir Hasod in the Madhya Pradesh state of India.
- Cari Lightner, a 13-year-old girl, was killed by a drunken driver while walking in a bike lane along Sunset Boulevard and New York Avenues in Fair Oaks, California. The driver was soon released, leading her mother to found Mothers Against Drunk Driving. The 46-year-old driver, who had recently been arrested for another DUI hit-and-run, left Cari's body at the scene. Cari's mother, Candace (Candy) Lightner, organized Mothers Against Drunk Driving and subsequently served as its founding president. A 1983 television movie about Lightner garnered publicity for the group, which grew rapidly. The Irving, Texas–based organization was founded on September 5, 1980.
- The Helsinki Convention on the Protection of the Marine Environment of the Baltic Sea Area, signed in 1974, entered into force (after having been signed by East Germany, Poland, Finland, Denmark, Sweden) with an agreement not to allow pollution of the Baltic.
- Annie Wu Suk-ching established Beijing Air Catering Ltd, the first joint venture company to be set up in the People's Republic of China since 1954.
- A group of 3,000 protesters set up a camp at Gorleben, in Lüchow-Dannenberg (Wendland), in the Lower Saxony state of West Germany, to protest against the establishment of a nuclear waste dump, and declared the occupied area as the Free Republic of Wendland (Freie Republik Wendland). The "Free Republic" lasted for 32 days, until police moved in on June 4 to evict the protesters.
- Died: George P. Elliott, 61, American poet and novelist

== May 4, 1980 (Sunday) ==
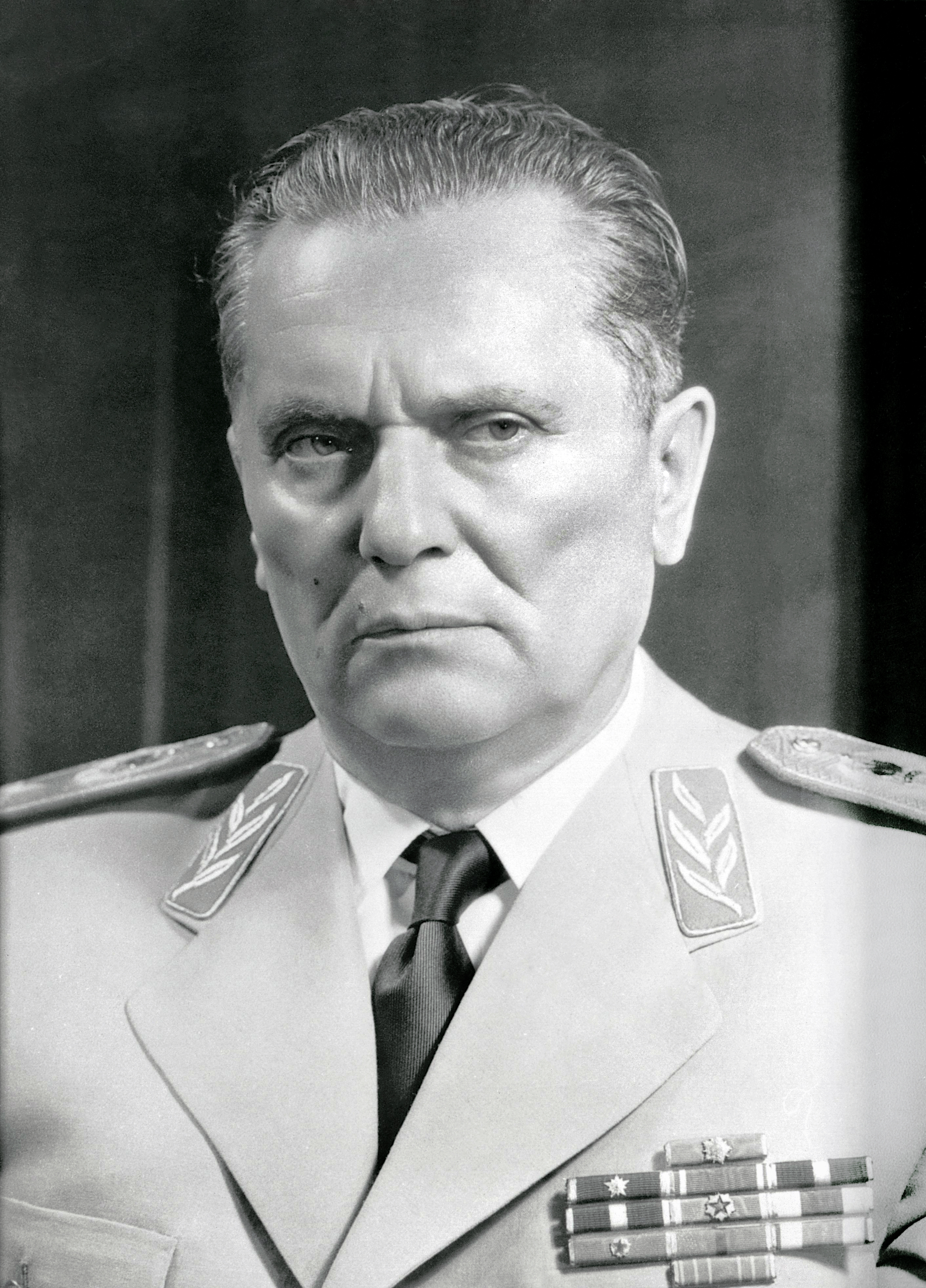
Josip Broz (Tito)

- Yugoslav President Josip Broz Tito died at 3:05 in the afternoon at the University of Ljubljana Medical Center. Vice President Lazar Koliševski, the Communist leader of the Yugoslavian state of Macedonia, temporarily became president until the scheduled expiration of his one-year vice presidency on May 15.
- Pope John Paul II issued a decree barring Roman Catholic priests from serving in political offices. Among those affected by the ruling was U.S. Representative Robert F. Drinan of Massachusetts, a Jesuit priest and "the only Roman Catholic cleric in Congress". Drinan, a Democrat, was running for a sixth term of office and withdrew from the race in accordance with the papal order.
- In a rush to see the Pope during his visit to Zaire, nine people were killed in Kinshasa and 72 others injured when the gates were opened to the grounds of the People's Palace.
- The United States Department of Education began operations in Washington, DC, after separating from the U.S. Department of Health, Education, and Welfare. Shirley Hufstedler took office as the first cabinet level Secretary of Education.

== May 5, 1980 (Monday) ==
- The Declaration on Euthanasia was issued by Pope John Paul II.
- Commandos from Britain's 22nd Special Air Service (SAS) rescued the 19 of the remaining 21 hostages in the siege of the Iranian Embassy in London. The attack was ordered after the occupying terrorists executed two of the hostages following Iran's refusal to release political prisoners. Three of the five terrorists were killed, and the other two were captured.
- The bodies of the eight U.S. servicemen who had been killed during the Desert One attempt to rescue the American hostages at the U.S. Embassy, were flown out of Iran from the Mehrabad International Airport to Zürich. A U.S. Air Force C-130 then transported the nine caskets (which included the remains of another person whom the Iranian government insisted was one of the American raiders) to Dover Air Force Base in Delaware the next day. On Sunday, Iranian government had allowed the remains to be removed from the city morgue in Tehran, after an agreement was signed with Syrian Catholic Archbishop Hilarion Capucci, Roman Catholic nuncio Annibale Bugnini, and Switzerland's Ambassador to Iran, Erik Lang.
- Konstantinos Karamanlis was elected as the new President of Greece, after the Parliament voted, 183 to 117, for him to succeed President Konstantinos Tsatsos in June. Karmanalis had served as prime minister since 1974.
- The Petition of Fifty (Petisi 50) was signed by 50 prominent Indonesians, including former prime ministers Burhanuddin Harahap and Mohammad Natsir, to protest President Suharto's use of the state policy of Pancasila against political opponents.
- Freelance U.S. journalist Cynthia Dwyer was taken prisoner in Tehran, where she had been reporting on the U.S. Embassy hostage crisis. Iranian guards went to Dwyer's room at the Hilton Hotel in Tehran and charge her with being a spy for the U.S. Central Intelligence Agency. She would be held captive until February 10, 1981, when she was expelled from the country.
- Born: Hank Green, American Internet personality, author, and entrepreneur, in Birmingham, Alabama
- Died: Emanuele Basile, 30, Italian police captain, the chief of the Carabinieri's district in Sicily, after being shot the night before as he was walking into his home town of Monreale. The killing prompted the issuance of 55 arrest warrants the next day against the Cosa Nostra drug traffickers.

== May 6, 1980 (Tuesday) ==
- In a rare labor strike in the Soviet Union, 200,000 employees of AvtoVAZ auto and truck manufacturing plants in the city of Gorky (now Nizhny Novgorod) walked off of the job and refused to work for three days as a protest against inadequate supplies of food. The employees returned to work on May 8 after fresh food was rushed to the two industrial complexes. Although no mention of a disturbance was made in the state-controlled Soviet press, reports reached the Moscow bureau of Financial Times, the London business daily newspaper, which published the information on June 14. The plants, in co-operation with Italy's Fiat company, manufactured the Soviet Lada automobile and now have operations in the city of Tolyatti.
- In the U.S., the NBC television network announced that it would not telecast the 1980 Summer Olympics from Moscow. Edgar H. Griffiths, Chairman of NBC's parent company, RCA said at a meeting of RCA stockholders, "NBC will not be televising the Olympics because the U.S. team will not be participating, because this is not in accord with the policy of the president of the United States." NBC had spent US$70,000,000 for rights to and preparation for the broadcast. Even after insurance paid for most of the loss, the company still lost $22,000,000.
- Faced with the impossibility of reconciling the various factions vying for power in the Chadian Civil War, French forces withdrew their last troops after three years of operations.
- NASA announced the discovery of a previously unknown 15th moon of the planet Jupiter, found by astronomer Stephen P. Synnott on an image transmitted by Voyager 1 on March 5, 1979, and on seven other photos. Temporarily designated as "S/1979 J 3", the small moon is now called Metis.
- Born: Kasumi Takahashi, Japanese-born Australian gymnast and winner of five gold medals at the age of 14; in Tokyo
- Died: Andrew Durant, 25, Australian musician for the country rock group Stars, died of cancer.

== May 7, 1980 (Wednesday) ==
- At the age of 86, Paul Geidel, convicted of second-degree murder in 1911, was released from the Fishkill Correctional Facility in Beacon, New York, after 68 years and 245 days, marking the longest-ever time served by an American inmate. Geidel, a bellboy at the Iroquois Hotel in New York City, had been arrested on July 28, 1911, at the age of 17 after killing an elderly stockbroker and hotel guest, William Henry Jackson. From 1926 to 1972, he had been confined at the Dannemora State Hospital for the Criminal Insane. Paroled in 1974, he elected to stay in prison for six more years. He died in a nursing home in 1987.
- The appointment of U.S. Senator Edmund Muskie of Maine as the new U.S. Secretary of State was confirmed by his colleagues, 94 to 2. The only votes against him were those of Senator Gordon J. Humphrey of New Hampshire and Jesse Helms of North Carolina. Muskie himself voted "present". He then resigned and was sworn into office as a cabinet secretary the next day.
- Roberto D'Aubuisson, Salvadoran politician believed to have ordered the assassination of Archbishop Oscar Romero, was arrested on a farm and charged with planning a coup d'état to depose the ruling junta. He was soon released and resumed his campaign of terror.

== May 8, 1980 (Thursday) ==
- Frank Fenner announced the global eradication of smallpox on behalf of the World Health Organization (WHO).
- The largest state funeral in history was held as world leaders from 128 of the 154 United Nations members appeared for the services for the late Yugoslavian President Josip Broz Tito.

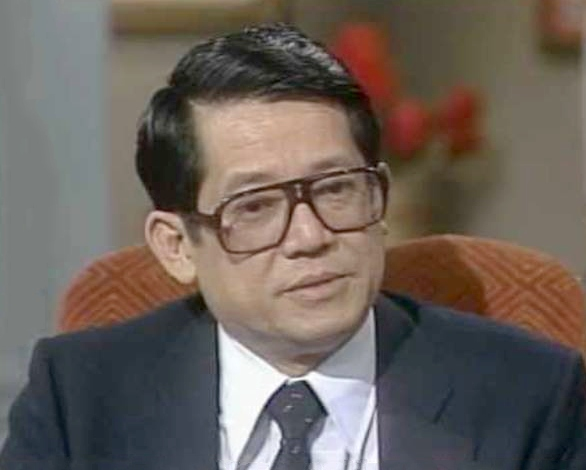
Aquino

- Former Philippine Senator Benigno Aquino Jr., the one-time opposition leader and a critic of President Ferdinand Marcos, was released from Manila's Fort Bonifacio prison, after being in detention since 1972. Marcos had given his approval, and the Philippine Supreme Court concurred, in order for Aquino to travel to the United States for heart bypass surgery. Aquino departed the next day, pledging to return to jail within four weeks. He elected not to come back until 1983, and would be assassinated upon his return to Manila.
- Died: Dr. Farrokhroo Parsa, 58, the first female Iranian cabinet minister and former Minister of Education of Iran, was executed by firing squad.

== May 9, 1980 (Friday) ==
- At 7:38 a.m. in Florida, the Liberian freighter Summit Venture hit the Sunshine Skyway Bridge over Tampa Bay. A 1,400-foot (430 m) section of the bridge collapsed, killing 35 people. Twenty-three of the dead had been the passengers and driver of a Greyhound bus that had just departed St. Petersburg, Florida as one of its stops on the way from Chicago to Miami.
- The second round of voting for Iran's parliament was conducted, with runoff elections for 124 of the 270 seats where no candidate had received a majority on March 14. On March 14, 98 seats had been filled by a clear majority. The radical Islamic Republican Party won a plurality of the seats. Voting was still postponed for 48 other seats in districts that were "experiencing anti-government unrest". With 222 of the seats decided, the Majlis could convene and pass legislation under the republic's constitution, which allowed parliament to be held with a two-thirds quorum (180 of 270 members present).
- The U.S. Immigration and Naturalization Service transferred the first of thousands of Cuban refugees from Florida to Fort Chaffee, a U.S. Army base near Fort Smith, Arkansas, and expected that as many as 20,000 arrivals from the Mariel boatlift would be housed there.
- William J. Murray, the son of Madalyn Murray O'Hair and the plaintiff on whose behalf the Murray v. Curlett was decided by the U.S. Supreme Court issued its ruling against prayer in American public schools, issued a public apology for his role in the court decision. Murray wrote in a letter, "If it were within my personal power to help to return this nation to its rightful place by placing God back in the classroom, I would do so." O'Hair's response was "Pretty strange. I think what this is, he's after mother again. But don't ask me why."
- Died:
  - James Alexander George Smith "Jags" McCartney, 34, Chief Minister of the Turks and Caicos Islands since 1976, was killed in the crash of a twin-engine Cessna 411 private plane after departing from Washington, D.C. to Atlantic City. After an apparent engine malfunction, the plane went down in a wooded area in Vineland, New Jersey at about 3:00 p.m., killing all four people aboard. McCartney was identified from dental records after his passport and other documents were found in the wreckage.
  - Kate Molale, 52, South African political activist, died six days after an auto accident in Morogoro, Tanzania.

== May 10, 1980 (Saturday) ==
- Eight Cuban Air Force MiG fighter planes attacked and sank the patrol boat HMBS Flamingo, a patrol boat of the Royal Bahamas Defence Force, after Flamingo attempted to seize two Cuban fishing vessels, Ferrocem 165 and Ferrocem 54, which had entered Bahamian territorial waters near Ragged Island. Four of the Bahamian Marines were killed, while the commander of Flamingo and the 15 remaining crew were picked up by the vessels.
- Lee Iacocca, chairman of the board of the Chrysler Corporation, received final approval from the three-member U.S. Chrysler Loan Guarantee Board for a federally-guaranteed $1.5 billion loan from the United States Treasury. The money, which was available to Chrysler starting May 27, was sufficient to rescue the company from bankruptcy. Treasury Secretary G. William Miller conceded that, without federal aid, "quite frankly, the resources of Chrysler would be exhausted this month."
- Greek Prime Minister Konstantinos Karamanlis was sworn in as the new President of Greece, succeeding Christos Sartzetakis. Georgios Rallis became the new Prime Minister of Greece.
- For the first time in the history of the Statue of Liberty, the 94-year-old structure was scaled by climbers. Mountaineers Kevin Drummond and Stephen Rutherford had staged the event to protest the 1972 murder conviction of Black Panther leader Geronimo Pratt. In the process, they caused an estimated $80,000 in damage to the thin copper skin of the robe of Miss Liberty, before spending the night "on the gigantic foot of the statue."

== May 11, 1980 (Sunday) ==
- After ten days, the worst labor crisis in the history of Sweden came to an end when the Svenska Arbetsgivareföreningen, the nation's federation of employers, agreed to a plan by a government arbitration panel to raise employee's wages by 7.3 percent. Earlier in the day, Director Olof Lungren of the employer's federation announced the rejection of the plan, calling it "destructive for Sweden's economy." Prime Minister Thorbjörn Fälldin called an emergency meeting of the cabinet and successfully urged the employer's to reverse their stance in order to end the strike, which had idled 31,000 companies and idled 800,000 workers, and shut down television broadcasts, public transportation, air travel, and non-emergency medical services. One hour after Fälldin summoned Lungren to his office, the employer's federation announced that it would make the 7.3% increase, which had already been agreed to by the 2,200,000 member confederation of unions, the Landsorganisationen i Sverige (LO).

== May 12, 1980 (Monday) ==
- The first crossing of North America by balloon was successfully completed by Maxie Anderson and his son Kristian Anderson, as the Kitty Hawk landed near the village of Grosses-Roches Quebec. The balloon landed at 7:30 in the morning, four days after departing Fort Baker, California. Anderson was killed on June 27, 1983, near Bad Kissingen, West Germany.
- Colonel Jaime Abdul Gutiérrez became the new chairman of the Revolutionary Government Junta of El Salvador, after Adolfo Arnoldo Majano left.
- Born: Rishi Sunak, British-Indian politician, Prime Minister of the United Kingdom

== May 13, 1980 (Tuesday) ==
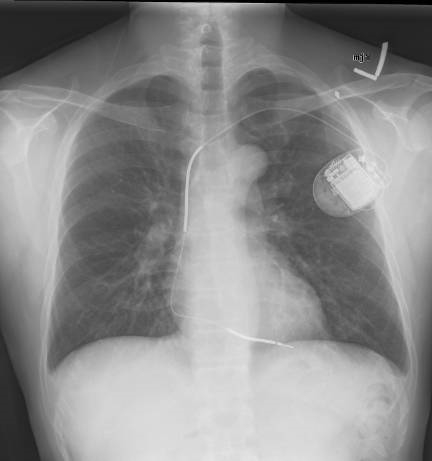
An implanted ICD

- Inventors Michel Mirowski, Morton M. Mower, Alois A. Langer and Marlin S. Heilman were issued U.S. Patent 4,202,340 for the ICD, the first heart defibrillator that could be surgically implanted. Pending since February 15, 1978, the patent application was titled “Method and Apparatus for Monitoring Heart Activity, Detecting Abnormalities, and Cardioverting a Malfunctiong Heart.”

== May 14, 1980 (Wednesday) ==
- The Sumpul River massacre occurred in Chalatenango in El Salvador, as the Salvadoran Army killed more than 300 refugees who were trying to flee into neighboring Honduras during the government's campaign against the Farabundo Martí National Liberation Front (FMLN) guerrilla group.
HEW split into HHS and DOE
- The United States Department of Health, Education and Welfare (HEW) was renamed the United States Department of Health and Human Services (HHS) in advance of the inauguration of the new U.S. Department of Education. HEW Secretary Patricia Roberts Harris, who remained after U.S. Department of Education was created on May 4, continued as HHS secretary.
- In South Korea, at least 50,000 university students battled with police and army troops in six cities, demanding that President Chun Doo-hwan resign and martial law be lifted. At Seoul, riot police fired tear gas to rout students as they approached the national capitol, and anti-government demonstrators stole three city buses to push back police barricades, while another 10,000 protested at Gwangju. Protests also broke out in Daegu, Jeonju, Suwon, and Incheon. After martial law was extended to the entire nation, the government arrested the leaders of the student movement and protests escalated, eventually to be shut down with mass killings.
- In Brazil, Embratel inaugurated Transdata, the first telecommunication system of South America.

== May 15, 1980 (Thursday) ==
- Libya's president Muammar Gaddafi announced a currency exchange program and the introduction of new Libyan dinar banknotes for the five and ten dinar denominations (worth, at the time, $16 and $32) and directed that citizens would be allowed one week to exchange their existing notes at the Central State Bank branches, after which only the old 5 and 10 dinar notes would be worthless. People making the exchange, however, were informed that only 1,000 dinars worth of new notes would be allowed per customer, a move that "effectively wiped out the savings of the middle-class as well as the hoarded cash of the black marketeers" and that "brought a windfall of £1.5 billion to the cash-starved Treasury". After a public uproar, announced on June 11 that the seized money would not be confiscated or invested without full consultation with the 167 local "People's Congresses" in Libya.
- Cvijetin Mijatović became the new Yugoslavian head of state as Chairman of the Collective Presidency, which rotated annually among the heads of the six constituent republics and two autonomous provinces. Mijatović, the leader of the SR Bosnia-Herzegovina, succeeded Lazar Koliševski, who had assumed office 11 days earlier on the death of President Tito, and served exactly one year until May 15, 1981.
- West Germany's Olympic Committee joined the group of nations boycotting the 1980 Summer Olympics in Moscow, after its delegates voted, 59 to 40, to punish the Soviet Union for its invasion of Afghanistan.
- U.S. Senator Edward M. Kennedy, trailing in the delegate count in his campaign against President Carter for the Democratic Party nomination, offered to drop out of the race if Carter would agree to a nationally televised debate. Carter declined the challenge.
- Born: Josh Beckett, American baseball pitcher and 2003 World Series MVP; in Spring, Texas

== May 16, 1980 (Friday) ==
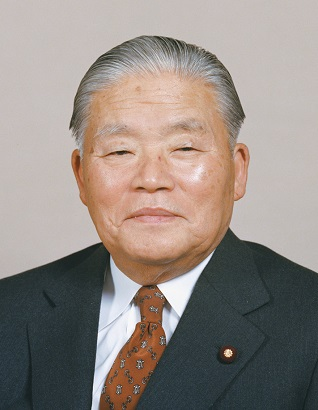
Prime Minister Ohira

- By a margin of 243 against him and only 187 in his favor, Japan's prime minister Masayoshi Ohira and his government lost a vote of confidence in the Shugiin, the lower house of Japan's bicameral parliament, the National Diet. Ohira was reportedly stunned as members of his own Liberal Democratic Party (LDP) abstained rather than voting in his favor on a resolution that he had been expecting to win by a simple majority. The action marked the first time in 27 years that a ruling prime minister had lost a confidence vote. Given the choice between resigning or calling new elections, Ohira chose the latter and died a few weeks later during the campaign.
- Rookie Earvin "Magic" Johnson scored 42 points to lead the Los Angeles Lakers to a 123–107 victory over the Philadelphia 76ers to clinch the National Basketball Association championship in Game 6 of the best-4-of-7 series for the Lakers. The Lakers prevailed despite the absence of Kareem Abdul-Jabbar, who had sprained his ankle two days earlier. Although the game was tied, 50 to 50, at halftime, the Lakers had an 83–73 lead after three quarters. High scorer for the Sixers was Julius "Dr. J" Erving, who had 27 points.

== May 17, 1980 (Saturday) ==
- A U.S. federal court jury in Tampa, Florida, acquitted four members of the Miami-Dade Police Department of civil rights charges in the Miami killing of Arthur McDuffie, an African-American insurance executive. The decision led to three days of rioting in Miami that killed 19 people and injured 350. The 12 member jury, composed of all white men, returned its verdict at 2:36 in the afternoon after deliberating for three hours. Less than four hours after the verdict was reported, an estimated 5,000 outraged black Miamians surrounded Miami's Metro Justice Center building and violence began. Three people were dead by midnight in the predominantly black Liberty City neighborhood. On December 17, McDuffie had been beaten by the four defendants, who had chased him after he had reportedly driven through a red traffic light on his motorcycle, and he died four days later. After their exoneration, the four police officers and another suspended policeman were restored to their jobs.
- In the worst accident since the Mariel boatlift had started, a yacht carrying 52 Cuban refugees capsized in the Caribbean Sea, 28 miles (45 km) north of Cuba. Ten people drowned and four others were missing. Two U.S. Coast Guard cutters, USCGC Courageous and USCGC Vigorous rescued 38 passengers, only half of whom had life jackets. The two member crew of the boat, the Olo Yumi, did not send a distress signal, and the rescue did not begin until a Coast Guard helicopter spotted it while on patrol.
- A high-profile national memorial ceremony was held for the last president of China, Liu Shaoqi, more than a decade after he had died in disgrace in 1969. Liu's ashes were scattered into the sea at Qingdao in accordance with his last wishes.

== May 18, 1980 (Sunday) ==
- The Mount St. Helens volcano in Washington erupted at 8:32 in the morning. Fifty-seven people were killed; 250 homes, 47 bridges, 15 miles (24 km) of railways, and 185 miles (298 km) of highway were destroyed. A massive debris avalanche, triggered by an earthquake of magnitude 5.1, caused a lateral eruption that reduced the elevation of the mountain's summit from 9,677 ft (2,950 m) to 8,363 ft (2,549 m), leaving a 1-mile (1.6 km) wide horseshoe-shaped crater. The debris avalanche was up to 0.7 cubic miles (2.9 km3) in volume

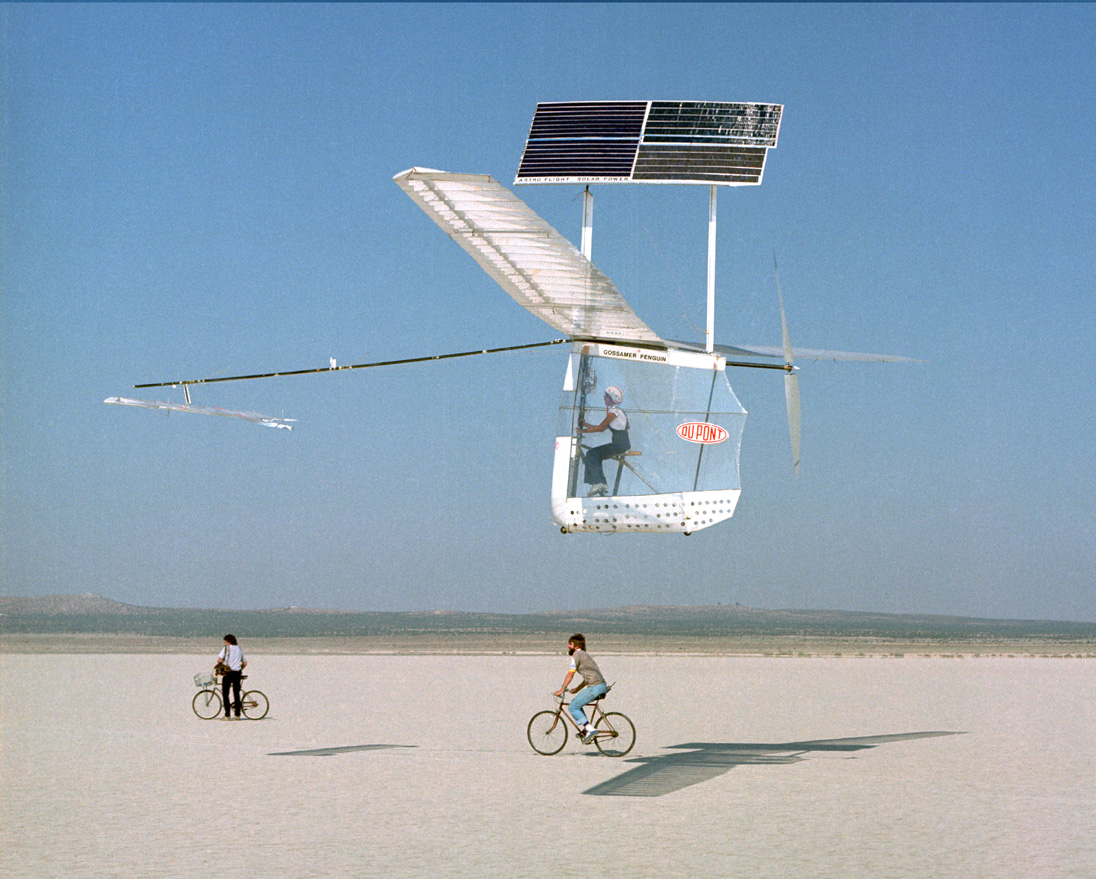
Gossamer Penguin

- Invented by engineer Paul MacCready, the Gossamer Penguin, the first solar-powered experimental aircraft, made its initial flight, using and airstrip at Minter Field, an airport serving Shafter, California. The inventor's 13-year-old son, Marshall MacCready, piloted the plane, adding 80 pounds (36 kg) to the 62 lb (28 kg) Gossamer Penguin. While the solar plane, powered by banks of photovoltaic cells, was not able to lift off on its own, it was flown for 100 yards (91 m) at an altitude of 12 feet (3.7 m) and an average speed of 15 miles per hour (24 km/h).
- The People's Republic of China successfully tested its first intercontinental ballistic missile (ICBM), the DF-5 (Dongfeng 5). The Xinhua News Agency then announced, "China achieved complete success this morning in launching its first carrier rocket to the destined area in the Pacific Ocean." Believed by western analysts to have been launched from the Xinjiang province, the missile traveled 6,200 miles (10,000 km) to a target in the South Pacific. A U.S. Associated Press report commented that "A missile with that range could carry a nuclear warhead to anywhere in the Soviet Union or to the west coast of the United States."

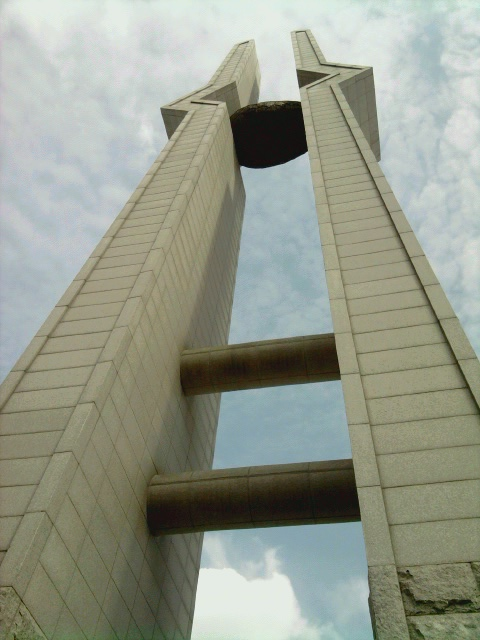
The May 18th Minjung Struggle Memorial Tower, commemorating the Gwangju Uprising

- The Gwangju Uprising began at Chonnam National University hours after a spokesman for South Korea's President Chun Doo-hwan announced that martial law would be extended across the entire nation of 38 million people and the Republic of Korea Army Chief of Staff, General Lee Hui Sung, closed all universities and schools and banning all political gatherings. The decree banned people from striking or failing to show up for work, required advance review and censorship of press reports, and provided that people violating the martial law order could be searched, arrested or detained without warrants. Political opponents of President Chun were arrested, including former presidential candidate Kim Dae-jung and former prime minister Kim Jong-pil, the leader of South Korea's Democratic Republican Party (Minju Gonghwadang).
- The first elections in Peru since 1963 was conducted to elect a president and for the 60 senators and 180 deputies of the Peruvian Congress. Former president Fernando Belaúnde Terry won 45% of the vote, ahead of Armando Villanueva and 13 other candidates. Under the constitution, the candidate with the largest number of votes had to have a minimum of 35% of the votes cast. Belaúnde had been the winner of the last election in 1963 before he was deposed in a coup d'état.
- Born: Kawee Tanjararak "Beam", Thai singer and member of the Thai boy band D2B, in Bangkok.

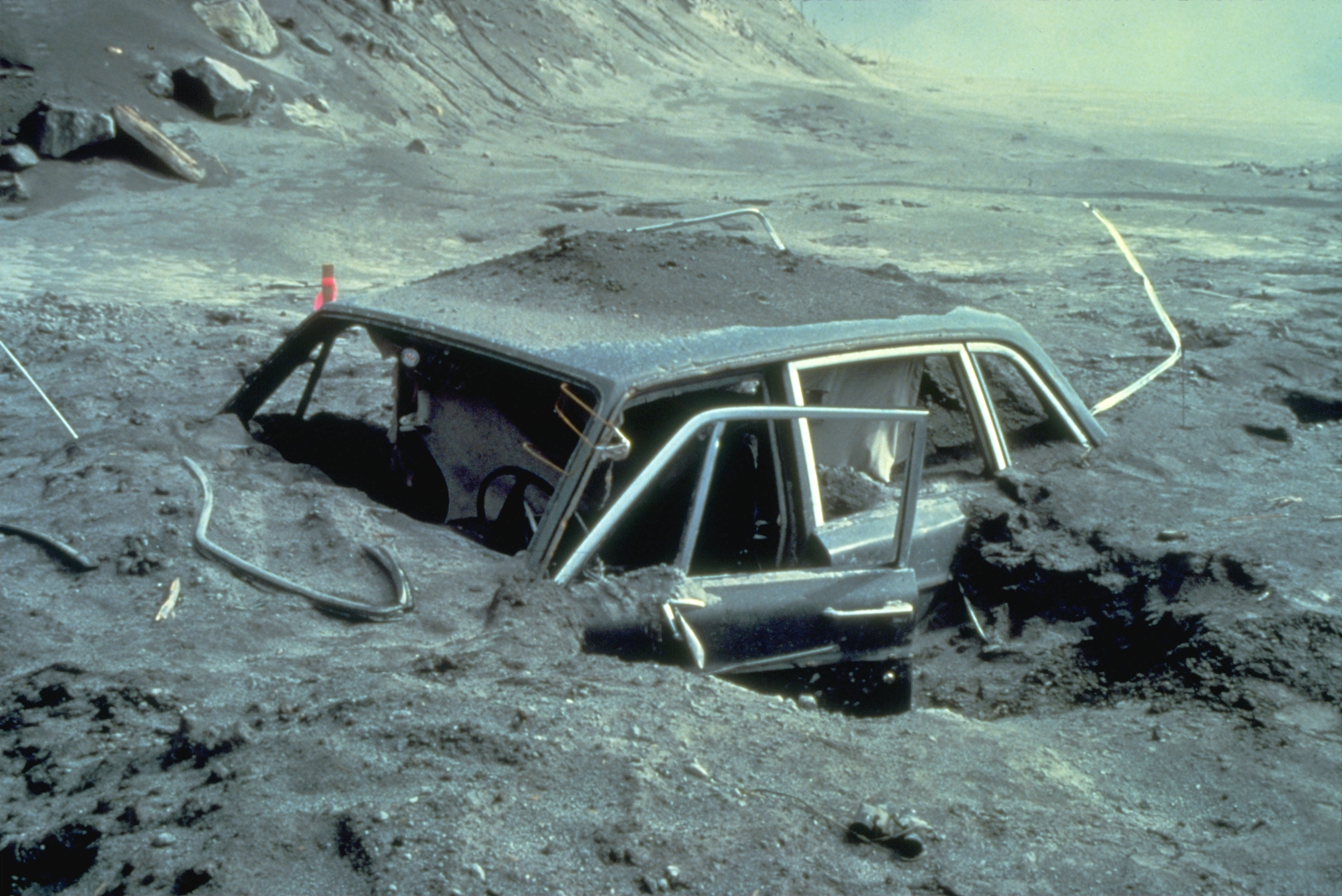
Blackburn's car after the Mount St. Helens eruption

- Died: Persons killed in the eruption of Mount St. Helens eruption included
  - Reid Blackburn, 27, photographer for the Vancouver, Washington newspaper, The Columbian
  - Robert Landsburg, 48, a freelance photographer at the scene
  - David A. Johnston, 30, a volcanologist for the United States Geological Survey
  - Harry R. Truman, 83, a retired businessman, bootlegger, and prospector who told reporters that he would refuse to leave his home
- Died: Ian Curtis, 23, singer-songwriter of acclaimed English post-punk band Joy Division, in Macclesfield, hanged himself.

== May 19, 1980 (Monday) ==
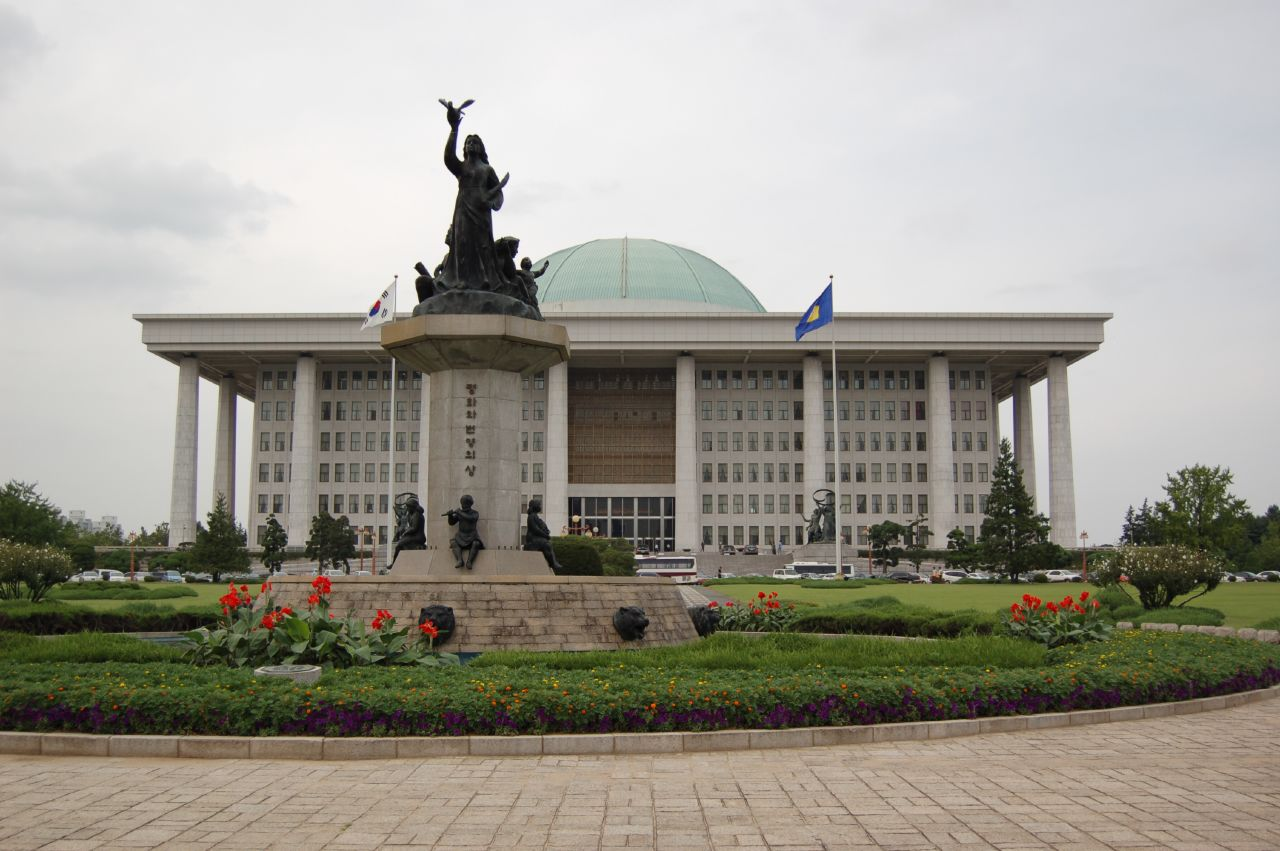
Korean National Assembly

- South Korea's military leaders ordered the shutdown of the nation's 300-member unicameral parliament, the National Assembly (Daehanminguk Gukhoe), one day before it was to begin its new session, and closed the headquarters of both major political parties, the Democratic Republican Party and the opposition New Democratic Party. The New Democrats had previously announced that they would introduce a resolution that would legally end martial law.
- William Voltz, the captain of American Airlines Flight 71 saved 261 people at Chicago's O'Hare International Airport, averting a collision with Braniff International flight 231 at the last moment during a landing. Both aircraft were Boeing 727 airliners. The American flight from Newark had 128 on board, and was cleared to land on O'Hare's Runway 9 Left, which intersected Runway 4 Left, where the Braniff jet (with 133 on board) was taxiing for takeoff to Kansas City. Voltz was able to lift his plane and missed the Braniff 727 by only 100 feet (30 m).

== May 20, 1980 (Tuesday) ==
- Voters in Quebec rejected independence from Canada by a margin of 60% to 40%. The question on the ballot was whether to give the Canadian province "exclusive power to make its laws, levy its taxes and establish relations abroad — in other words, sovereignty — and at the same time to maintain with Canada an economic association including a common currency." (Québec d'acquérir le pouvoir exclusif de faire ses lois, de percevoir ses impôts et d’établir ses relations extérieures, ce qui est la souveraineté, et, en même temps, de maintenir avec le Canada une association économique comportant l’utilisation de la même monnaie)
- A fire killed 157 elderly women residing at the Eventide Home for the Aged in Kingston, Jamaica. The telephone wires to the home had been severed, and four men were seen running from the building shortly before the blaze started at 1:00 in the morning, but the arsonists were never located or identified.
- Shin Hyun-hwak resigned after five months as Prime Minister of South Korea, along with all 18 members of his cabinet, in protest over the installation of martial law. As the protests in Gwangju developed into a civilian rebellion, South Korean Air Force Major General Park Choon-hoon was named the next day as the new prime minister, and many of Premier Shin's cabinet returned to their positions.
- The first test launch of the Kh-80 Meteorit Soviet cruise missile was made, but failed because the missile failed to emerge from its container on the mobile ground launcher and burned the mechanism instead. Three other attempts were unsuccessful until December 16, 1981, when the missile launched successfully and flew 50 kilometres (31 mi). It had a maximum range of 5,000 kilometres (3,100 mi).
- Henryk Jaskuła of Poland became the third man to circumnavigate the globe non-stop and single-handed, returning in yacht, Dar Przemyski, to the port of Gdynia, where he had departed on June 12, 1979. Jaskula would die, less than a week before the 40th anniversary of his cruise, at the age of 96.

== May 21, 1980 (Wednesday) ==

- The Empire Strikes Back, the long-awaited sequel to the 1977 blockbuster Star Wars, premiered in 126 cities in the United States and Canada in advance of Memorial Day weekend and would become the highest-grossing film of the year. It had been unveiled on May 17 at the Kennedy Center in Washington DC.
- In Deadwood, South Dakota, a raid by county, state and federal agents closed the houses of prostitution that had been allowed to operate for more than a century since Deadwood's "Wild West" days of the 1870s. Deadwood's three remaining brothels — "The White Door", "Pam's Purple Door" and "Dixie's Green Door" — were closed down as the new local government did, as one reporter put it, "what Marshal Hickok never would have done,"
- Eintracht Frankfurt won the 1980 UEFA Cup Final, 1 to 0 at home over Borussia Mönchengladbach, two weeks after its 2 to 3 loss at Mönchengladbach in the first of two games. Although the aggregate score of the two games was 3 to 3, Frankfurt won the Cup based on the higher number of away goals. The final four of UEFA Cup teams were all West German, with Bayern Munich and Stuttgart having won their quarterfinals in March.

== May 22, 1980 (Thursday) ==
- Pac-Man, the highest-grossing arcade game of all time, was test-marketed by Namco in Japan at locations in the Shibuya section of Tokyo. It had been invented by a team headed by Toru Iwatani and was originally branded as "Puck Man" when it was distributed in Japan in July.
- Voters in Egypt approved six constitutional amendments, including the creation of a Shura Council as a second chamber for the formerly unicameral Parliament of Egypt; requiring Islamic principles as the basis of new legislation; and creating a multiparty system of elections. Another amendment removed the requirement that a president be limited to two six year terms in office, making President Anwar Sadat eligible to run for a third term in 1982, which would "open the way for Anwar Sadat to remain president for life." Sadat would serve as president for the rest of his life, assassinated 17 months later on October 6, 1981. His successor, Hosni Mubarak, was elected for four consecutive terms before being removed from office in 2011.
- Gustáv Husák was elected to another term as President of Czechoslovakia by a 343 to 0 vote in the Communist nation's Federal Assembly (Federální shromáždění (Czech) or Federálne zhromaždenie (Slovak)). Husak, the chairman of the Communist Party of Czechoslovakia (KSČ) was the only candidate considered by the 150-member House of the Nations (the Sněmovna národů, which consisted of 75 Czech and 75 Slovak deputies) and the 200-member House of the People (Sněmovna lidu).
- Popular talk show host Phil Donahue and television actress Marlo Thomas married.

== May 23, 1980 (Friday) ==
- Relocation began of the 710 families of the Love Canal neighborhood of the city of Niagara Falls, New York, almost two years after a state of emergency had been declared by the New York State Health Commission of the land's contamination by dioxins and other hazardous chemicals dumped by the Hooker Chemical Company. Initially, the United States Environmental Protection Agency (EPA) proposed only to pay the costs of relocating the families for only one year, but the U.S. and New York governments would eventually purchase the contaminated property and work for decades on an environmental cleanup.
- A mid-season strike by Major League Baseball players was averted a few hours before it would have canceled its first game. The strike deadline had passed at 12:01 in the morning, but representatives of the 26 National League and American League owners had continued discussions in New York with the Major League Baseball Players Association (MLBPA) union and reached an agreement at 5:00 in the morning Eastern time. The first game that would have been called off, the Los Angeles Dodgers' at the Chicago Cubs, began as scheduled at 1:30, with the Cubs winning, 2 to 0.
- The Shining, Stanley Kubrick's classic horror film, adapted from Stephen King's novel, was released in theaters nationwide. While the movie was popular, critics were generally unfavorable, with one noting that the film "takes two and a half hours to go nowhere" and another commenting that "the film is too grandiose to be the jolter that horror pictures are expected to be."
- Died:
  - Terry Furlow, 25, American NBA basketball guard for the Utah Jazz, was killed in a car wreck, less than two months after the end of the season.
  - Munir Sarhadi, 48, Pakistani musician who played the sarangi, a Hindustani string instrument.

== May 24, 1980 (Saturday) ==
- In its decision in United States v Iran, the International Court of Justice ruled that the militants holding 50 U.S. Embassy personnel hostage were 'agents' of the Iranian Government, and ordered the Iranian government to release of embassy captives and to pay reparations. Iran did not comply with the World Court's decision, and the hostages would not be released until January 20, 1981.
- Five of the seven conspirators in the October 26 assassination of Park Chung-hee, President of South Korea, were executed by hanging. Kim Jae-gyu, the former director of the Korean Central Intelligence Agency, who had shot Park in the head after the two had argued at a dinner party, went to the gallows at the Seoul prison at 7:30 in the morning along with four of the co-conspirators.
- The New York Islanders won their first Stanley Cup, after game six of the Stanley Cup went into sudden death overtime. Bobby Nystrom made the goal for the 4–3 win over the Philadelphia Flyers after 7 minutes and 11 seconds of extra play before 14,495 fans in Uniondale, New York to win the Stanley Cup for the first time in team history. In their first season, the team, placed on suburban New York's Long Island only two years earlier, the Islanders had filed for bankruptcy before reversing their fortunes.

== May 25, 1980 (Sunday) ==
- The Republic of Vemerana was declared on the island of Espiritu Santo in the New Hebrides (now Vanuatu), with Jimmy Stevens as its prime minister. Sources with the colonial government said that the separatists had been funded by an American group of businessmen, the Phoenix Foundation, of Carson City, Nevada, with the objective of establishing "an independent country, free of taxes and government restrictions". After the New Hebrides was granted independence in July as Vanuatu, the Vemerana rebellion was ended in August.
- Johnny Rutherford won a third Indianapolis 500 while driving Jim Hall's revolutionary ground effect Chaparral car, designed by John Bernard and fabricated by Bob Sparshot. The race was the slowest in 18 years, with the winner driving at an average speed of less than 143 miles per hour (230 km/h)
- Boxer James Scott, a contender for the world light heavyweight title despite having to conduct his bouts at the Rahway State Prison in New Jersey, had his first professional loss, in an upset by Jerry "Bull" Martin. Scott, convicted of the murder of Everett Russ, would get a reversal of his conviction and a new trial, but would be found guilty in January and sentenced to life in prison. Martin's loss and his subsequent conviction ended his aspiration for a world title.

== May 26, 1980 (Monday) ==
- Bertalan Farkas, the first cosmonaut from Hungary, was launched on Soyuz 36 to the Salyut 6 space station along with Valeri Kubasov at 9:21 p.m. Moscow time (1821 UTC) from Baikonur Cosmodrome in the Kazakh SSR. Farkas and Kubasov returned to Earth on July 31.
- Former U.N. Ambassador and Congressman George Bush, Ronald Reagan's remaining opponent for the Republican nomination, conceded defeat and urged his supporters to back Reagan. Speaking from his campaign headquarters in Houston, Bush said "I see the world not as I wish it were, but as it is." Six days earlier, Bush had seen the biggest victory of his campaign, a 2 to 1 win over Reagan in the Michigan primary, but Reagan had reached the number of delegates necessary for nomination in other primary results that evening. As Reagan's running mate, Bush would be elected Vice President of the United States in November and would be elected the 41st president of the United States in 1988.
- In Bloomington, California, serial killer Stephen Wayne Anderson burglarized the house of 81-year-old Elizabeth Lyman, murdered her, robbed her house, and then prepared himself a meal in her kitchen. As Anderson, who had escaped from the Utah State Prison on November 12, was eating and watching television, San Bernardino County Sheriff's deputies responded to a neighbor's call and arrested him. Anderson admitted to the murder of Lyman and eight other people, and would be executed by lethal injection at California's San Quentin State Prison on January 29, 2002.

== May 27, 1980 (Tuesday) ==
- Hundreds of protesters were killed in Gwangju by Republic of Korea Army troops, bringing an end to a rebellion that had started on May 18 at Chonnam University. After rebels had taken control of the city of 800,000 from local police days earlier, an ultimatum was delivered to the rebels at 2:00 in the morning to lay down their weapons. Ninety minutes later, tanks and troops moved in and took control of the city by dawn, followed by house-to-house searches for insurgents. Official figures released by the Martial Law Command put the death toll at 144 civilians, 22 troops and four police killed, but the actual death toll may have been as high as the 2,000 range.
- Haiti's president, Jean-Claude Duvalier married Michèle Bennett Pasquet in a wedding that cost the nation three million U.S. dollars. The extravagance of the couple's wedding did not lack local critics, though The Christian Science Monitor reported that the event was "enthusiastically received by a majority of Haitians."
- Prime Minister Hua Guofeng flew to Tokyo to make the first state visit by a Chinese leader to Japan in almost 2,000 years. Hua remained in Japan for six days after being greeted at Haneda Airport by Japan's ailing Prime Minister Ohira, and then made a courtesy call to the Emperor Hirohito.
- Died:
  - Ted DeVita, 17, nicknamed the "Bubble Boy" because he spent the final years of his life in a protective environment in order to protect him from his lack of immunity to disease. DeVita had developed aplastic anemia in 1972 and resided at a sterile isolation room at the National Institutes of Health facility in Bethesda, Maryland, though he was sometimes allowed to make short excursions from the hospital in a protective space suit that he eventually outgrew. The frequent blood transfusions that had protected him had gradually caused him heart trouble from a buildup of iron in his blood.
  - Gün Sazak, 48, Turkish nationalist politician and former government minister, was assassinated in a drive-by shooting. Sazak, deputy chairman of the right-wing Action Party, had been outside his home in the Kavaklıdere neighborhood of Ankara and was loading luggage in his car when he was shot in the head and in the stomach by two gunmen.

== May 28, 1980 (Wednesday) ==
- For the first time, women graduated as officers from the three major United States service academies, with 61 from the United States Military Academy at West Point, New York, 55 from the United States Naval Academy at Annapolis, Maryland, and 97 from the United States Air Force Academy in Colorado Springs, Colorado. The top ranking female cadets were Andrea Hollen, 8th in her class of 870 at West Point; Kathleen Conley, 8th from the Air Force Academy class of 887; and Elizabeth Belzer, 30th in the Annapolis class of 938. Jean M. Butler was first in her class at the United States Coast Guard Academy at New London, Connecticut.
- Twenty-three workmen for the Canadian Pacific Railway were killed, and 11 injured, in a horrific bus crash near the small village of Webb, Saskatchewan.
- The Nixon White House tapes, tape-recordings made at the Oval Office during the administration of U.S. President Richard M. Nixon, were made available for the general public to listen to at the U.S. National Archives. On the first day, the National Archives played 31 historic recordings, 30 of which had been listened to by the Watergate grand jury in 1974.
- Isao Harimoto of the Lotte Orions became the first (and only) Japanese baseball player to have 3,000 hits in his career. Born in Hiroshima to Korean parents five years before the dropping of the atomic bomb, Harimoto had played in the Pacific League since 1959. Harimoto's 3,000th hit, a home run, came in an 11 to 4 win over the visiting Hankyu Braves at Kawasaki. Ichiro Suzuki of Japan surpassed 3,000 hits in U.S. Major League Baseball, after getting 1,278 in Japan's Pacific League.
The old and new flag of Newfoundland
- The Flag of Newfoundland (now Newfoundland and Labrador) was approved by the House of Assembly of the province of Newfoundland by a vote of 22 to 10. The geometrical design by Chris Pratt, of "six triangles and an arrow" had been unveiled on April 29 and eliminated any use of the former British flag, the Union Jack, which had been adopted as Newfoundland's official provincial flag in 1952.
- Died: Walter Tobagi, 33, Italian journalist and writer, was killed in a terrorist attack by the Brigade XXVIII March, a left-wing terrorist group.

== May 29, 1980 (Thursday) ==
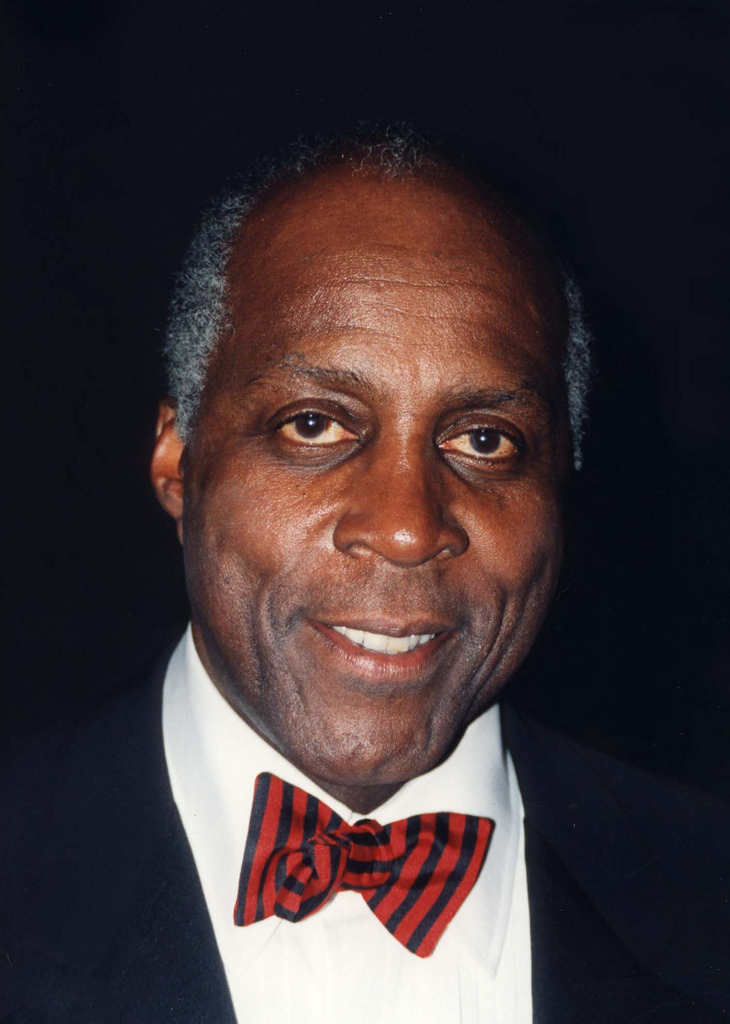
Jordan

- American civil rights leader Vernon Jordan, the president of the National Urban League, was shot and critically injured by a sniper as he stepped out of his car in Fort Wayne, Indiana. Jordan had addressed 450 people at a dinner for the Urban League at the Marriott Inn the night before, and was at the hotel parking lot at 2:05 in the morning. The assassination attempt, made from a car that had stopped on an exit ramp on Interstate Highway 69 in sight of the hotel, was later charged to Joseph Paul Franklin.
- The U.S. Federal Communications Commission voted to limit the protection for the nation's 25 clear-channel stations to a 750-mile (1,207 km) radius around the transmitter. Stations on those AM radio frequencies outside the area of protection were no longer required to sign off or power down after sundown.

== May 30, 1980 (Friday) ==
- Pope John Paul II became the first pontiff in more than 175 years to visit France, arriving at Orly Airport near Paris, where he was greeted by France's prime minister Raymond Barre. The Pope and his retinue then flew by helicopter to a meeting with President Valery Giscard d'Estaing. The last papal visit had been by Pius VII, who had presided at the December 2, 1804, Coronation of Napoleon I.
- The first of six women to die in the Tynong North and Frankston Murders in Australia, Allison Rooke, disappeared after experiencing trouble with her car. Rooke, a 66 year old resident of Frankston, Victoria, had told neighbors she was preparing to take a bus to do grocery shopping at the Frankston Shopping Centre and to see a realtor. Her decomposed body was found on July 5.
- A federal court ruled, in the case of Fricke v. Lynch, that a gay high school student could bring a same-sex date to a high school dance. The court held that the free speech provisions of the First Amendment protected the rights of gay and lesbian students to attend their high school events with a date of their choice. Amid heavy security, Aaron Fricke appeared that evening at the senior prom for Cumberland High School with a male companion, Paul Guilbert. The dance itself took place at the Pleasant Valley Country Club at Sutton, Massachusetts rather than at Rhode Island high school. Since the Fricke ruling, American public high schools increasingly allowed gay and lesbian students to attend school functions with their same-sex partners.

== May 31, 1980 (Saturday) ==
- Japan's prime minister Masayoshi Ohira was hospitalized for exhaustion the day after campaigning opened for the June 22 general election. Ohira had complained of tiredness for several days before making speeches in Tokyo on the first day of the campaign, and was taken by ambulance to the Toranomon Hospital in Tokyo after becoming ill at home. Doctors diagnosed him with angina pectoris and recommended that he remain in the hospital and Ohira turned the campaign for the Liberal Democratic Party to the LDP vice chairman, Eiichi Nishimura, on June 6. While in the hospital, Ohira suffered a heart attack and died on June 12.
