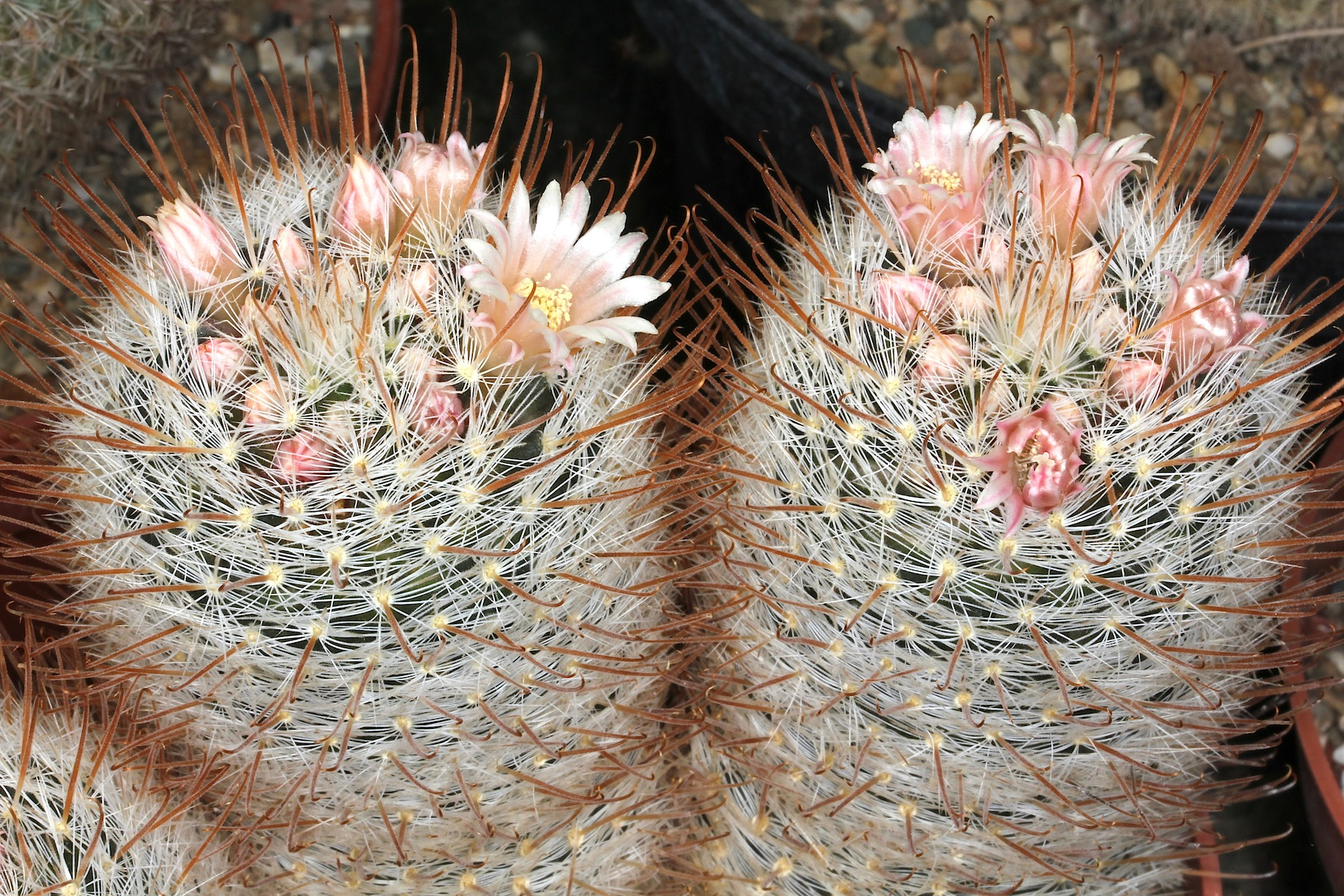

Conservation status
- Least Concern (IUCN 3.1)

Scientific classification
- Kingdom: Plantae
- Clade: Tracheophytes
- Clade: Angiosperms
- Clade: Eudicots
- Order: Caryophyllales
- Family: Cactaceae
- Subfamily: Cactoideae
- Genus: Mammillaria
- Species: M. mercadensis

Binomial name
- Mammillaria mercadensis Patoni

Synonyms
- List: Chilita gilensis (Boed.) Buxb.; Chilita jaliscana (Britton & Rose) Orcutt; Chilita mercadensis (Patoni) Orcutt; Chilita posseltiana (Boed.) Buxb.; Chilita rettigiana (Boed.) Buxb.; Ebnerella gilensis (Boed.) Buxb.; Ebnerella jaliscana (Britton & Rose) Buxb.; Ebnerella mercadensis (Patoni) Buxb.; Ebnerella posseltiana (Boed.) Buxb.; Ebnerella rettigiana (Boed.) Buxb.; Escobariopsis jaliscana subsp. zacatecasensis (Shurly) Doweld; Escobariopsis jaliscana (Britton & Rose) Doweld; Escobariopsis mercadensis (Patoni) Doweld; Escobariopsis rettigiana (Boed.) Doweld; Mammillaria berkiana A.B.Lau; Mammillaria brachytrichion Lüthy; Mammillaria flavihamata Backeb.; Mammillaria fuscohamata Backeb. ex Repp.; Mammillaria gilensis Boed.; Mammillaria guillauminiana Backeb.; Mammillaria jaliscana subsp. zacatecasensis (Shurly) D.R.Hunt; Mammillaria jaliscana (Britton & Rose) Boed.; Mammillaria kleiniorum Appenz.; Mammillaria mercadensis var. guillauminiana (Backeb.) Repp.; Mammillaria ocamponis Ochot.; Mammillaria pennispinosa subsp. brachytrichion (Lüthy) U.Guzmán; Mammillaria posseltiana Boed.; Mammillaria rettigiana Boed.; Mammillaria zacatecasensis Shurly; Neomammillaria jaliscana Britton & Rose; Neomammillaria mercadensis (Patoni) Britton & Rose; Neomammillaria rettigiana (Boed.) Y.Itô, without basionym ref.; Neomammillaria zacatecasensis (Shurly) Y.Itô, without basionym ref.

= Mammillaria mercadensis =

Species of cactus

Mammillaria mercadensis is a species of flowering plant in the cactus family (Cactaceae), native to north and west Mexico.

== Description ==
Mammillaria mercadensis is a cactus that grows either as an individual plant or as a group. It has a flattened, spherical, or slightly cylindrical shape, and its stems can reach a diameter of up to 8 centimeters. Its surface features conical or cylindrical bumps (warts) that are often filled with milky sap when the plant is in bloom. The axils of the plant (the joints where the stems meet the base of the plant) are very sparsely covered in fine, soft wool and lack bristles. The plant has one to seven central spines, which are typically up to 14 millimeters long. These spines can range in color from yellow to deep red or reddish-brown, and are lighter at the base. Among these central spines, one or occasionally two can be hooked. Additionally, the plant has 13 to 35 radial spines that are finely fluffy and white to yellow in color. These radial spines are typically 6 to 9 millimeters long.

When Mammillaria mercadensis is in bloom, it produces bell-shaped flowers that are extremely pale magenta or magenta in color. The flowers are between 1 and 2 centimeters long and have a diameter of the same length. After flowering, the plant produces reddish-green club-shaped fruits that contain brownish-black seeds with fine pits.

== Taxonomy ==
The species was first described by Carlos Patoni in 1910. It has attracted a large number of synonyms.

== Distribution and habitat ==
Mammillaria mercadensis is native to the northern and western Mexican states of Michoacán, Durango, Sinaloa, Jalisco, Aguascalientes, and San Luis Potosí. It grows among volcanic rocks in desert or semi-desert habitats such as dry shrubland at elevations of 1,800–2,400 m (5,900–7,900 ft).

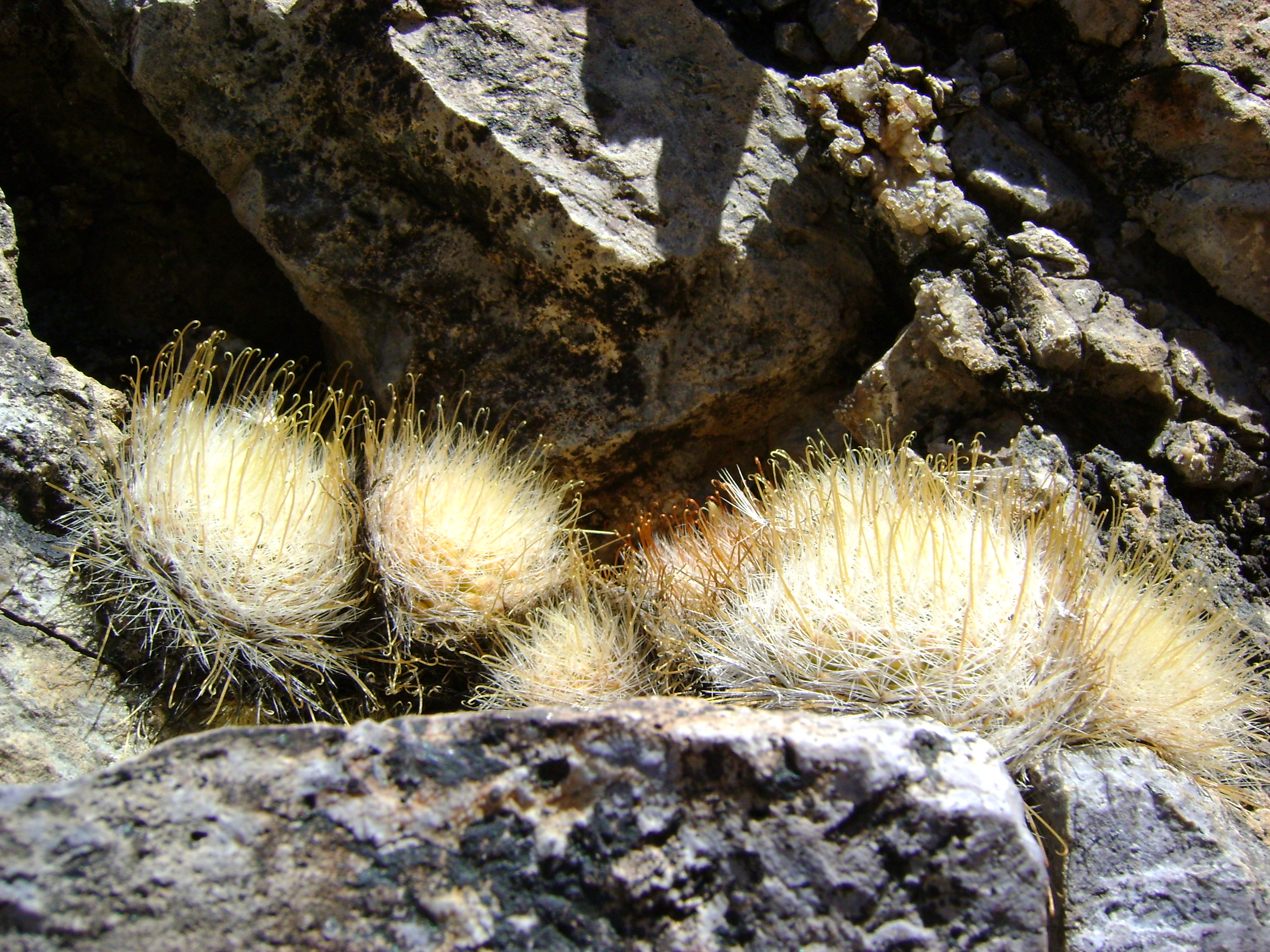
Plants near Linares Del Río, Durango, Mexico

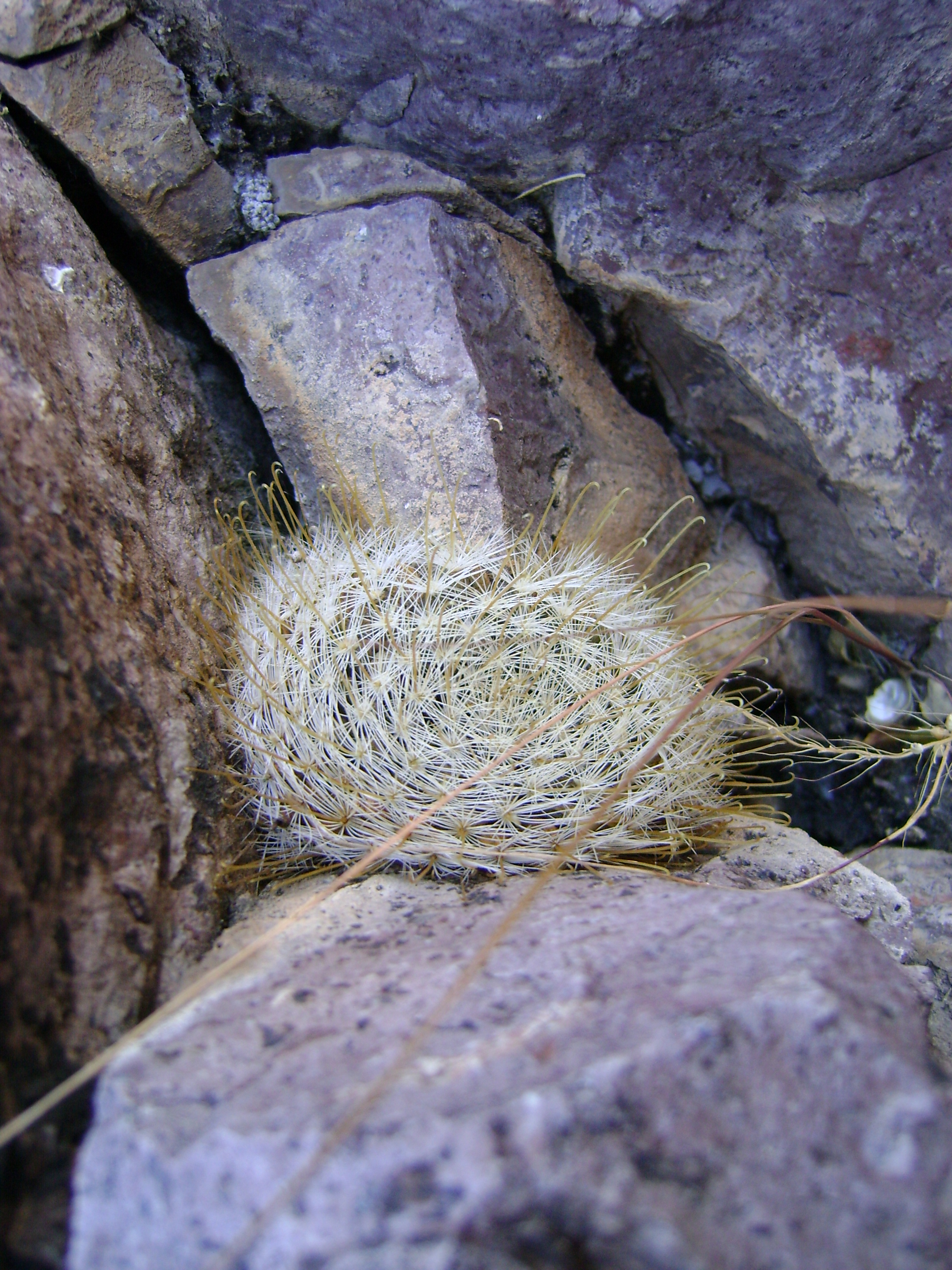

== Conservation ==
Mammillaria mercadensis has been assessed as "least concern" by the International Union for Conservation of Nature in 2017. Some species regarded as synonymous with Mammillaria mercadensis by Plants of the World Online have been assessed differently. Mammillaria berkiana was assessed as "vulnerable" in 2009. Mammillaria rettigiana was assessed as "endangered" in 2009. Mammillaria guillauminiana was treated as "data deficient" in 2013, partly because of uncertainty as to its relationship with Mammillaria mercadensis.
