= July 1980 =

Month of 1980

<<	July 1980					>>
Su	Mo	Tu	We	Th	Fr	Sa
		1	2	3	4	5
6	7	8	9	10	11	12
13	14	15	16	17	18	19
20	21	22	23	24	25	26
27	28	29	30	31

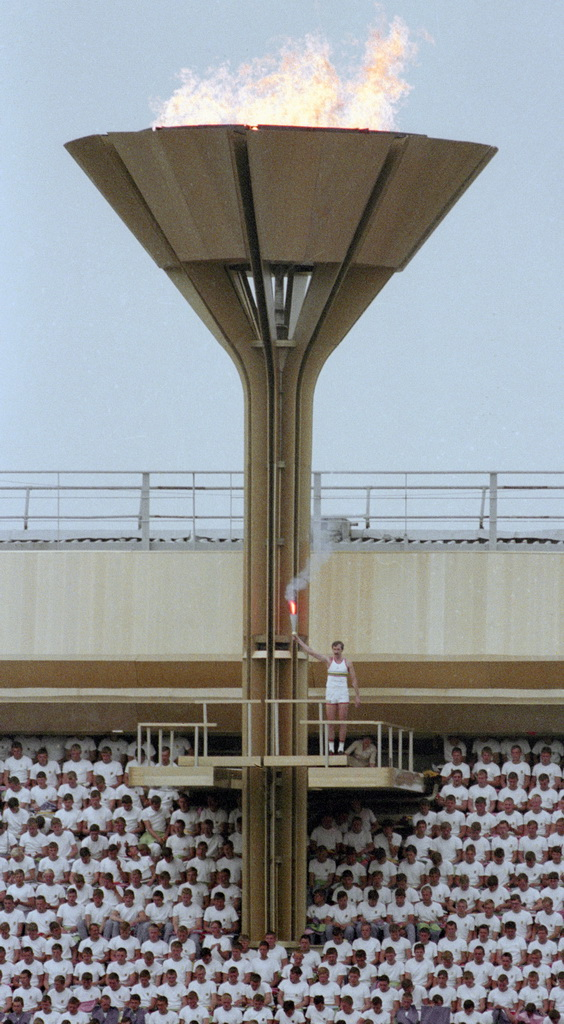
July 19, 1980: Summer Olympic Games open in Moscow

July 30, 1980: Republic of Vanuatu granted independence

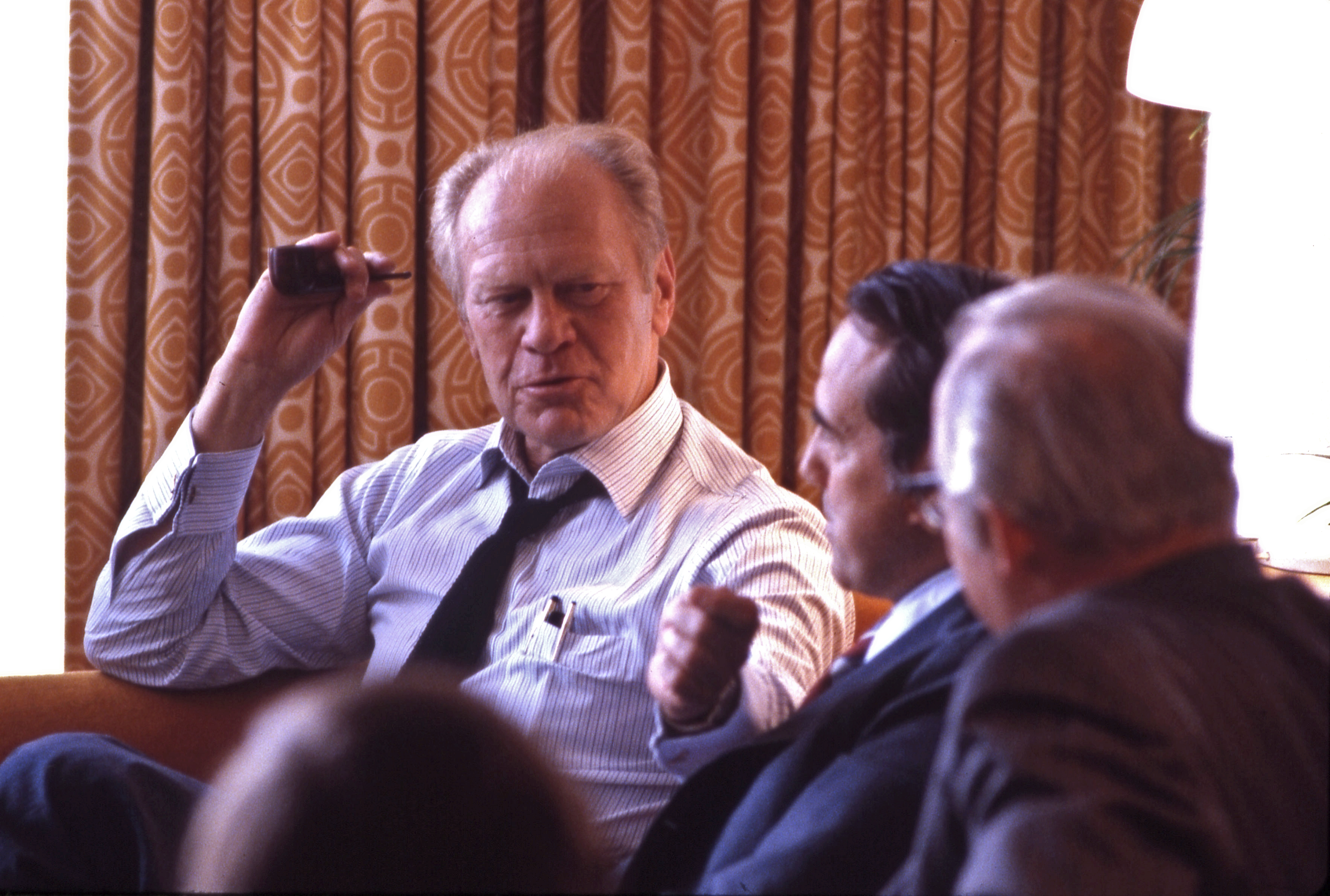
July 16, 1980: Former U.S. President Ford turns down offer to become U.S. vice president nominee

The following events happened in July 1980:

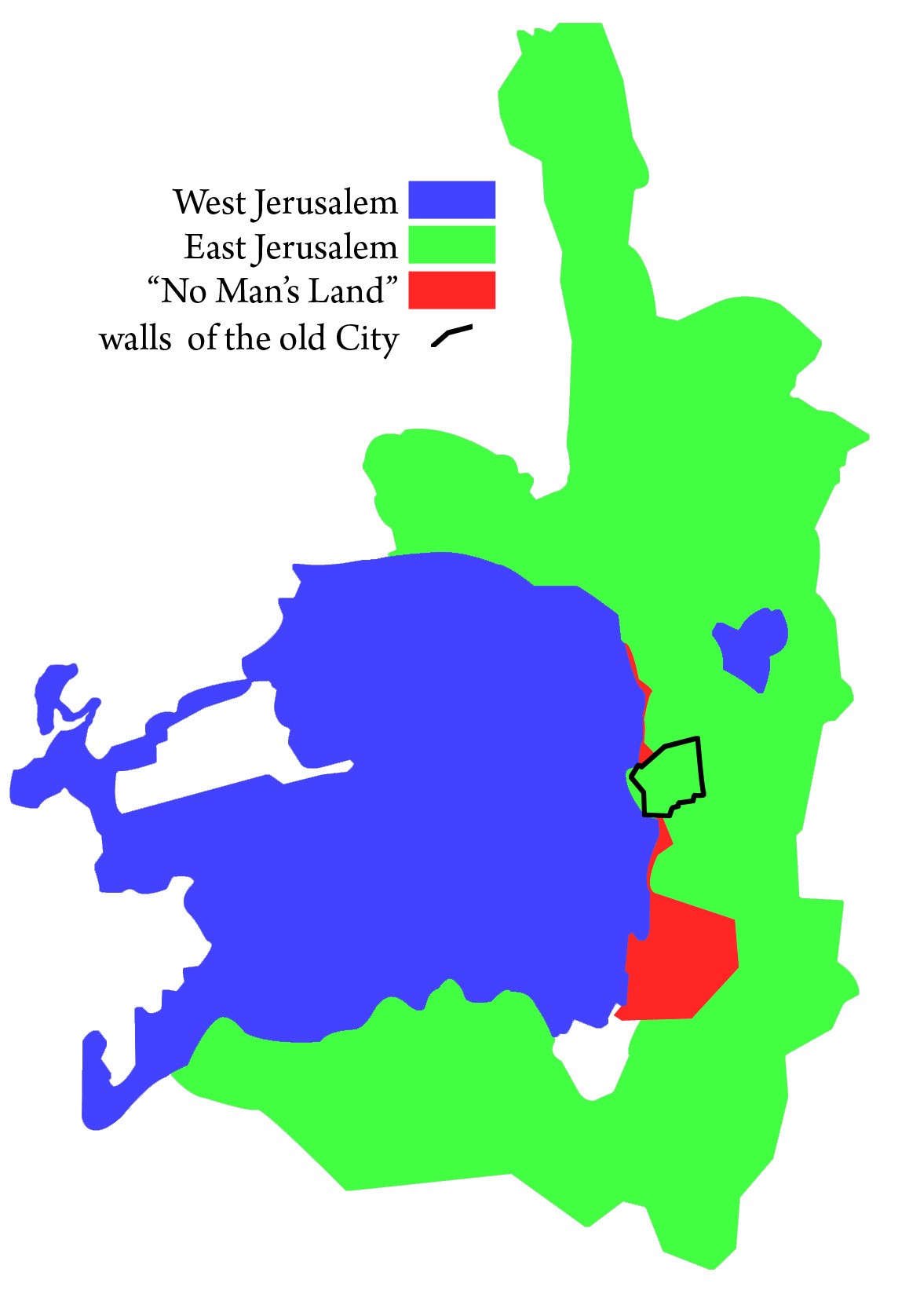
July 30, 1980: Israel's parliament votes for Jerusalem reunification and annexes former Jordanian territory in East Jerusalem (green) to Israel's West Jerusalem (blue)

== July 1, 1980 (Tuesday) ==
- "O Canada" became the national anthem for Canada after the National Anthem Act received royal assent and took effect as part of the Dominion Day celebrations.
- In Ohio, The Columbus Dispatch became the first newspaper to provide an electronic edition for computer users, as part of a service from the electronic CompuServe Information Service. In a precursor to newspaper websites on the Internet, the text of the Dispatch could be read on the home computers of CompuServe's 3,000 subscribers in Columbus. Initially the service was available from 6:00 in the evening to 5:00 in the morning on weekdays, and all day on weekends and holidays, and transmitted at a rate of 300 words per minute. The cost was an additional 8.33 cents per minute ($5.00 per hour, equivalent to $15.50 per hour in 2020). CompuServe unveiled similar deliveries for 10 other metropolitan newspapers, including The New York Times, the Washington Post, the Los Angeles Times and the Chicago Sun-Times.
- The Los Angeles Unified School District became the largest school system in the United States to adopt a calendar of year-round school as part of easing congestion in 44 overcrowded schools, starting with ten units (four elementary schools, and six middle and junior high schools. On July 7, the plan started in 34 more elementaries. Under the plan, one-fourth of the elementary students in a year-round school were on a 3-week vacation at any given time for every 9 weeks in school. In secondary schools, the rotation was 18 weeks of school with 6 week vacation breaks throughout the school year.
- The deregulation of the American trucking industry began as U.S. President Jimmy Carter signed the Motor Carrier Act of 1980 into law.
- In Oslo, Steve Ovett broke the world record for fastest mile, running in 3 minutes, 48.8 seconds, 2/10ths of a second faster than the mark of 3:49.0 set by his fellow Briton, Sebastian Coe in 1979. Earlier in the day, Coe set a new record for running 1,000 meters, in 2 minutes, 13.40 seconds, besting Rick Wohlhuter's 1976 record of 2:13.90.
- The U.S. Congress authorized a site of two acres in Constitution Gardens near the Lincoln Memorial for the Vietnam Veterans Memorial. With the $2.3 million cost for the memorial to paid for from private donations.
- In Kansas City, Missouri, the 40-story tall Hyatt Regency Hotel opened to the public, featuring an atrium above the lobby that included three pedestrian bridges and a construction flaw caused by the alteration of the support for the second and fourth floor bridges. Slightly more than a year later, on July 17, 1981, the decision to suspend the second floor bridge from the bridge above it, rather than from the ceiling, would result in the Hyatt Regency walkway collapse, killing 114 people and injuring 216.
- Born:
  - Nelson Cruz, Dominican Republic-born U.S. baseball outfielder, 2014 American League home run leader; in Las Matas de Santa Cruz
  - Ricky Champ, English TV actor; in Southend-on-Sea, Essex
  - Mizz Nina (stage name for Shazrina binti Azman), Malaysian fashion designer and TV personality; in Kuala Lumpur
- Died: C. P. Snow, 74, English novelist

== July 2, 1980 (Wednesday) ==
- The government of Poland announced that the price for consumer goods was being increased, after 14 years of prices being maintained at the same level with government subsidies. Two previous attempts to raise the price of meat— in December 1970 and June 1976— had been rescinded after rioting. Trybuna Ludu, the official newspaper of the ruling Polish United Workers Party, announced that increases were made because "there are now ways speedily to improve the market situation." The price of beef doubled from $1.50 per pound to $3.00 per pound, and raw bacon to $2.30 per pound. The first reported reaction was that 6,000 employees of a tractor factory in the Warsaw suburb of Ursus walked off the job in a one-day strike. Two days later, thousands of Polish workers walked off the job on what would be the first of many labor strikes that would lead to the recognition of the Solidarity Movement in August.
- U.S. President Jimmy Carter issued Presidential Proclamation 4771 and re-instated the requirement that young men register with the Selective Service System. At that time it was required that all males, born on or after January 1, 1960, register with the Selective Service System. Those who were now in this category were male U.S. citizens and male immigrant non-citizens between the ages of 18 and 25; they were required to register within 30 days of their 18th birthday even if they were not actually eligible to join the military.
- The government of Turkish Prime Minister Süleyman Demirel narrowly survived a vote of confidence in the lower house of parliament, with 214 supporting his removal and 227 opposed. Turkish military leaders had planned for a coup d'état to take place on July 11, but called it off in the wake of the vote; the Supreme Military Council met again on August 26 and overthrew Demirel's government on September 12.
- A U.S. federal judge in Miami ordered a halt to deportation of more than 4,000 black Haitians. In a 180-page decision, James L. King wrote that people who fled Haiti were victims of prejudice by the United States government and had been denied due process by the Immigration and Naturalization Service (INS).
- The comedy Airplane!, a parody of the popular disaster film genre, was released throughout the U.S. and Canada, and attracted generally favorable reviews. Janet Maslin of The New York Times wrote that "'Airplane!' has jokes— hilarious jokes— to spare. It's also clever and confident and furiously energetic." and Charles Champlin of the Los Angeles Times called in "a thrillingly nutty send-up of the movies, with the redeeming and overdue social value of generous and innocent laughter." However, Kathleen Carroll of the Daily News wrote that after the first hour, "'Airplane' loses its buoyancy. Jim Abrahams, David Zucker and Jerry Zucker... become so desperate for laughs that the jokes descend to a much cruder level. And 'Airplane' does an abrupt nosedive, turning into a hopelessly flat movie."
- Greenland's first national soccer football team played its first international match. The meeting, at Sauðárkrókur at the first annual Greenland Cup in Iceland, was against another Danish territory, the Faroe Islands. The new team lost its first game, 6–0. The next day, Greenland hosted Iceland in Húsavík, losing 4–1, finishing third in the tournament.
- Harborplace opened as a centerpiece of the revival of downtown Baltimore and the rebuilding of Baltimore's Inner Harbor. The $20 million shopping center had 120 restaurants, specialty markets and shops shielded beneath two glass-enclosed pavilions.

== July 3, 1980 (Thursday) ==
- The pilot of a crop-dusting airplane used his aircraft to take himself and 19 other people out of the Socialist Republic of Romania to flee the Communist government of Nicolae Ceaușescu. After taking off from Arad, Aurel Popescu flew across the Hungarian People's Republic for two hours before his fuel ran out as he crossed into Austria and glided to a safe landing in a cornfield near the village of Pertlstein.
- Two weeks before the Moscow Olympics, Elena Mukhina, the 1978 world champion in gymnastics was severely injured while training in Minsk. Mukhina fractured her cervical spine while practicing difficult maneuvers and was permanently paralyzed from the neck down.
- Born:
  - Harbhajan Singh, Indian cricket bowler; in Jalandhar, Punjab state
  - Roland Schoeman, South African swimmer, gold medalist in the 2005 and 2007 world championships and member of 2004 Olympic relay team; in Pretoria
- Died: Abdelhamid Sharaf, 41, Prime Minister of Jordan since December; from a heart attack. King Hussein announced the death in a live radio broadcast and said that "His death could not have come at a worse time."

== July 4, 1980 (Friday) ==
- Evonne Goolagong of Australia defeated Chris Evert Lloyd of the U.S. to win the women's singles title at Wimbledon for the first time in nine years.
- A group of 26 undocumented migrants from El Salvador were smuggled across the border from Mexico into the United States, and then robbed by their guides and abandoned in the Yuma Desert within the Organ Pipe Cactus National Monument in Arizona. The next day, one of the survivors reached Arizona State Route 85 near the town of Ajo. Searchers from the Pima County sheriff's office, the U.S. Border Patrol, the U.S. Customs Service, the National Park Service and the Arizona Department of Public Safety then searched the area and found 12 other survivors, along with 13 bodies of the unfortunate travelers who had died from dehydration. Border patrol agents had found three survivors on Friday night, who had insisted that there were no other people in the 517 sq mi (1,340 km^{2}) park, and a search was not started until 24 hours later.

== July 5, 1980 (Saturday) ==
- Björn Borg of Sweden defeated John McEnroe of the United States to win his fifth consecutive singles title at Wimbledon in what one reporter described as "the tennis match to end all tennis matches". The finals match came down to a tiebreaker in the fifth game of the fifth set after McEnroe edged Borg, 7 games to 6 in a tie breaker to even the best-of-5 match, two sets to two.
- Born: Fabián Ríos, Colombian TV actor, in Curití
- Died: Hans Bayer, known by the pseudonym Thaddäus Troll, 66, German journalist and Swabian German dialect poet, by suicide.

== July 6, 1980 (Sunday) ==
Mauritania

Shakespeare

- The abolition of legal slavery was announced in the Islamic Republic of Mauritania by the ruling Military Committee for National Salvation, led by its chairman, Lt. Col. Mohamed Mahmoud Ould Louly. A communique from the capital, Nouakchott, announced that the committee, after consultation with Islamic legal scholars (oulemas) "of the nation, on the question of slavery, which is considered by the regime to be anachronistic." The government said further that "The overwhelming majority of the oulemas recognized the justification of slavery under Islamic law", but that the scholars "had reservations as to its origins in Mauritania and the way the system is operated in our country." The order had no immediate effect on the practice of wealthy, white and light-skinned Arab-Berber exercising ownership over impoverished black Haratin residents.
- The Observer, London's Sunday newspaper, broke the news that computer scientists had found confirmation that William Shakespeare was the likely author of The Booke of Sir Thomas Moore. The Edinburgh University team, led by Thomas Merriam, had used a stylistic analysis of the words of the play in comparison to Shakespeare's other works. "If the attribution is accepted, The Observer noted, "it will be the first new play to be added to the Shakespeare canon since Pericles was included in the third folio edition of 1664."
- Seventy-one people, most of them Cuban tourists who were passengers on a double-decker excursion boat on the Canimar River, were killed when the XX Aniversario was hijacked by rebels, and then shelled and sunk by the Cuban Armed Forces.
- Born:
  - Pau Gasol, Spanish pro basketball player, 2002 NBA Rookie of the Year, and six-time All-Star; in Barcelona
  - Sami Khan (stage name for Mansoor Aslam Khan Niazi), Pakistani film and TV actor; in Lahore
- Died: Gail Patrick, 69, American actress and television producer who served as executive producer of the Perry Mason series

== July 7, 1980 (Monday) ==
- The massacre of 81 civilians occurred in Lebanon in the coastal town of Safra, after fighting between two rival Christian groups in the Lebanese Civil War. Safra, a stronghold of former Lebanese president Camille Chamoun's National Liberal Party was taken over by Bashir Gemayel's Phalangist militia. According to witnesses, the victims had spent the day on the beach while fighting went on in Safra, and were arrested and shot to death by Phalangist soldiers.
- The parliament of Syria passed a law making membership in the Muslim Brotherhood punishable by death. President Hafez al-Assad announced the next day that members of the Muslim Brotherhood would be spared the death penalty if they surrendered before being confronted by law enforcement. The legislation provided legal authority for "shoot on sight" raids on suspected Brotherhood hideouts.
- Military leaders in Iraq were informed of a decision, made the day before by the ruling Ba'ath Party under the leadership of President Saddam Hussein, to prepare to launch a war against Iran. An invasion would take place in September.
- Iran's chief prosecutor, the Ayatollah Ali Ghoddusi, issued an order requiring all female government employees to wear the full-length chador and the traditional black head veil in accordance with the Ayatollah Khomeini's order for women to comply with the Islamic dress code or to be fired. In the first year of the Iranian Revolution, western-style clothing had been tolerated by the new regime.
- The final performance by Led Zeppelin of "Stairway to Heaven" was made at the closing concert of the band's Tour Over Europe 1980, at the Eissporthalle near Berlin in the suburb of Charlottenburg-Wilmersdorf. After the death of drummer John Bonham in September, the heavy metal group broke up on December 4. The band would not do another full-length concert for more than 27 years until the reunion of Robert Plant, Jimmy Page and John Paul Jones December 10, 2007, in London.
- Born: Michelle Kwan, American figure-skater and five time World Championship ladies singles gold medalist; in Torrance, California
- Died:
  - Isadore "Dore" Schary, 74, Oscar-winning American screenwriter, playwright and later President of Metro-Goldwyn-Mayer (MGM) Studios.
  - Cleveland Denny, 24, Guyanese boxer and former Canadian lightweight champion, died in Montreal 17 days after being knocked out in a June 20 bout with Gaetan Hart. Denny never regained consciousness after the match at Olympic Stadium.
  - Dan White, 72, American character actor who appeared in hundreds of westerns on film and on television

== July 8, 1980 (Tuesday) ==
- A wave of labor strikes at 91 factories in Poland began in the town of Świdnik, a suburb of the city of Lublin, starting with a walkout of workers at the Communication Equipment Factory (Wytwórnia Sprzętu Komunikacyjnego, WSK), a manufacturer of parts for the State Aviation Works (Państwowe Zakłady Lotnicze or PZL). As a historian noted later, "the whole thing began... with a pork chop" when workers preparing to purchase the day's lunch found that the price of the pork chop dinner had increased from Zł 10.20 to Zł 18.10. At the time, the minimum monthly wage in Poland was Zł 5100 or $43 per month.
- All 156 passengers and 10 crew on Aeroflot Flight 4225 were killed. The Tupolev Tu-154 took off from Alma-Ata (now Almaty) in the Kazakh SSR to Simferopol in the Ukrainian SSR. The aircraft had reached an altitude of no more than 500 feet when the airspeed suddenly dropped because of thermal currents it encountered during the climb out. This caused the airplane to stall less than 5 km (3.1 mi) from the airport, crash and catch fire, killing all 156 passengers and 10 crew on board. To date, it remains the deadliest aviation accident in Kazakhstan. On July 14, news of a crash was published in a local newspaper, Kazakhstanskaya Pravda.
- Cathlyn Platt Wilkerson, a fugitive member of the terrorist Weather Underground, surrendered to prosecutors in New York City, after more than 10 years trying to avoid capture. Wilkerson had been eluding capture since fleeing an explosion and fire that destroyed her parents' Greenwich Village townhouse as the Weather Underground was building explosives in an adjacent home. Tried on the 1970 charges and convicted of illegal possession of dynamite, Wilkerson would be released on probation after serving 11 months in prison.
- The largest jump of paratroopers in the U.S. in peacetime had almost 2,400 U.S. members of the U.S. Army's 82nd Airborne Division — one-third of the division — participating. The troops of the 82nd Airborne, stationed at Fort Bragg in North Carolina, were sent to Eglin Air Force Base in Florida on 25 C-141 Starlifter cargo planes, each carrying 120 paratroopers. Although one of the Starlifters had to abort the test without dropping its troops, the others landed successfully in a field of brush and trees at Eglin AFB.
- Born:
  - Chetan Anand India badminton player and four-time national champion; in Vijayawada, Andhra Pradesh state
  - Robbie Keane, Irish soccer football forward and captain of the Ireland national team; in Dublin
- Died: Rudolf Creutz, 84, Austrian Nazi war criminal

== July 9, 1980 (Wednesday) ==
- Hundreds of Iranian officers and servicemen were arrested at Nojeh Air Base, near Hamedan, foiling a plot to overthrow the government of the Ayatollah Khomeini and President Abolhassan Banisadr, and to disestablish the Islamic Republic.
- Pope John Paul II visited Brazil. Seven people were crushed to death as a crowd surged into Castelão stadium in Fortaleza to see him. Although the stadium had a capacity of 120,000 people, an estimated 200,000 came to see the Pontiff.
- The record heat wave in the U.S., originally centered on Texas expanded across the South and the Plains States with temperatures above 100 °F in eight states and above 90° in twelve others. With the heat wave in its 17th day, the death toll rose to 177 nationwide. Within four days, 443 people in 15 states had died from heat stroke, with the majority of them in Missouri, Texas and Arkansas.

== July 10, 1980 (Thursday) ==
- Dr. Martin J. Cline of the University of California, Los Angeles (UCLA) performed the first human experiment with genetic recombination by implanting recombinant DNA (rDNA) material into a patient at the Hadassah Medical Center in Jerusalem without informing either the patient or the hospital's institutional review board (IRB). Dr. Cline's unauthorized experiments, done in the course of a bone marrow transplant on a patient in Israel and one day later in Italy, were revealed three months later.
- Ahmad Shah Al-Musta'in Billah, Sultan of Pahang was installed as the Yang di-Pertuan Agong, elected as the ceremonial monarch of Malaysia by the sultans of Malaysia's nine states. Ahmad Shah filled the vacancy caused on March 29, 1979, by the death of his predecessor, Yahya Petra, Sultan of Kelantan.
- A 51-year old Atlanta man with heatstroke reached the highest-recorded survivable body temperature ever recorded in a human being. Even after having his temperature lowered by being packed in ice for 15 minutes and having ice water pumped into and out of his stomach, Willie Jones— whom nurses at Grady Memorial Hospital nicknamed "the Human Torch"— was measured at 116.7 °F (47.1 °C). Earlier attempts at measurement were beyond the range of conventional thermometers, but his physician estimated that Jones's temperature "must have exceeded 120 degrees" when he was brought in.
- Born:
  - Jessica Simpson, American pop singer and actress; in Abilene, Texas
  - James Rolfe, American actor and filmmaker; in Philadelphia, Pennsylvania
  - Claudia Leitte, Brazilian pop singer and TV personality; in São Gonçalo, Rio de Janeiro state
  - Adam Petty, American NASCAR driver and the first fourth-generation athlete in U.S. American professional sports; in Trenton, New Jersey (killed in accident, 2000)
- Died: Joseph Krumgold, 72, American children's novelist

== July 11, 1980 (Friday) ==
- Australia's first commercial FM radio station, 3EON, began full-time broadcasting at 6:30 in the morning on 92.3 MHz in Melbourne. It had done some sporadic test broadcasting two days earlier of "its music format of 'rock and roll and heart and soul'." It is now called 3MMM as Triple M Melbourne.
- Richard Queen, one of the 53 remaining U.S. Embassy personnel held captive during the Iran hostage crisis, was released on humanitarian grounds after being diagnosed with multiple sclerosis.
- Born:
  - Justin Willman, American magician and comedian; in St. Louis
  - Tyson Kidd (ring name for Theodore Wilson), Canadian professional wrestler; in Calgary

== July 12, 1980 (Saturday) ==
- The 12.895 km (8.013 mi) long Fréjus Road Tunnel under Col du Fréjus in the Cottian Alps opened between France and Italy. At the time, it was the second longest road tunnel in the world (after the 16.918 km (10.512 mi) Arlberg Road Tunnel), before being superseded by the 16.918 km (10.512 mi) Gotthard Road Tunnel in September. It connects Modane in France and Bardonecchia in Italy.
- QUBE, a cable-television system in Columbus, Ohio with an interactive media channel that allowed viewer participation, sponsored a football game where the viewers were given the opportunity to decide the plays. In the game, a semi-pro football exhibition between the visiting Racine Gladiators of Wisconsin and the Columbus Metros, viewers were offered five choices for offensive plays (rush up the middle, rush to one side, and short, medium and long passes) and three defensive plays (straight defense, blitz or team choice). Metros coach Hal Dyer was required to follow whichever option received the highest tabulated number of viewer responses Roughly 5,000 of QUBE's 30,000 subscribers participated, and although the Metros took a 7 to 0 lead before the game was interrupted by a thunderstorm, they lost to the Gladiators, 10 to 7.
- Born: Petar Petković, Serbian politician, Director of the Office for Kosovo, in Zaječar, SR Serbia, SFR Yugoslavia
- Died: Pierre Satre, 71, French aviation engineer designer for the Sud-Aviation SE 210 Caravelle and later for the Concorde.

== July 13, 1980 (Sunday) ==
- Soviet Union native Vladimir Mikhailovich "Walter" Polovchak, a 12-year-old boy who had lived in Chicago since his family's move from the town of Sambir in the Ukrainian SSR, left home with his sister Nataly after his parents announced that they would return to the USSR. As a respondent in Polovchak v. Meese, Walter resisted his parents' efforts to retake custody, and he was granted political asylum until he turned 18 years old and then applied for and was granted American citizenship in 1985.
- Born: Pejman Nouri, Iranian soccer football midfielder on the Iranian national team; in Rezvanshahr, Gilan Province
- Died: Seretse Khama, 59, the first President of Botswana, from pancreatic cancer.

== July 14, 1980 (Monday) ==
- In Canada, a fire on the top floor of the three-story Extendicare nursing home in Mississauga, Ontario, killed 21 residents and injured 35 others. All of the victims were either bedridden or confined to wheelchairs. The nursing home's policy was to keep the least ambulatory patients on the higher floors.
- Billy Carter, the brother of U.S. President Jimmy Carter, was forced to register with the U.S. Department of Justice as a foreign agent for Libya. Billy acknowledged that he had accepted $220,000 from the government of Muammar Gaddafi.

== July 15, 1980 (Tuesday) ==
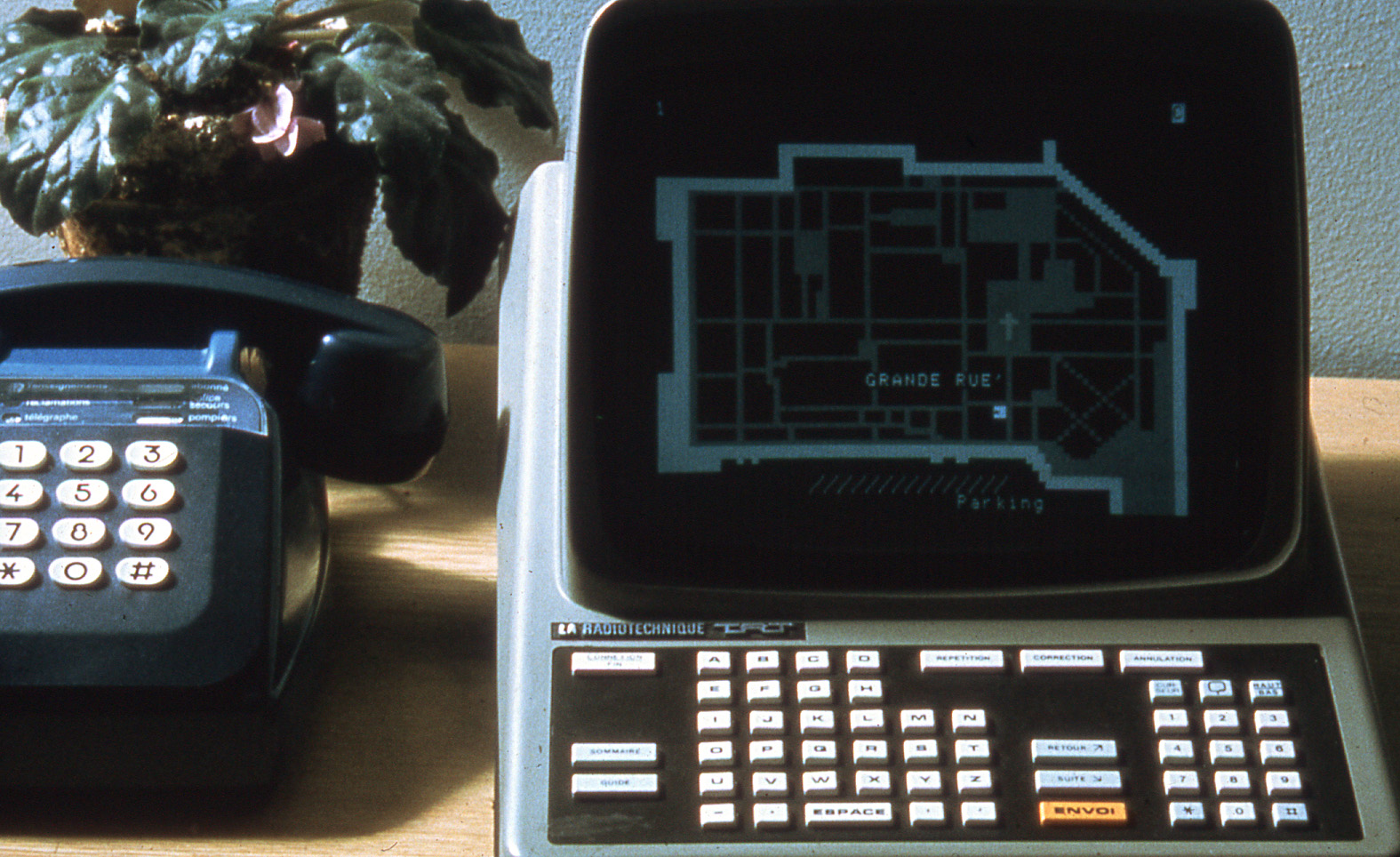
The Minitel terminal

- Minitel, a computer network that initially offered access to an electronic directory of the telephone numbers and addresses of 23,000,000 households in France, was given its first test marketing by Postes, Télégraphes et Téléphones, the French agency that regulated telephones. Computer terminals and modems were provided to 35 households and 20 businesses in Saint-Malo.
- Stephen J. Solarz, a Democrat for New York, became the first U.S. Congressman to visit North Korea since the Korean War after being invited.
- A severe and destructive thunderstorm struck four counties in western Wisconsin, including the city of Eau Claire. It caused over $250 million in damage and three people were killed.
- Born: Mike Zambidis, Greek professional kickboxer and middleweight champion
- Died: Ben Selvin, 82, American bandleader and one of the first best-selling recording artists with the 1919 single "Dardanella"

== July 16, 1980 (Wednesday) ==
- Former U.S. President Gerald R. Ford considered, then rejected, a proposal to run for Vice President as the running mate of Republican presidential nominee Ronald Reagan. Ford, who had served as vice president for ten months until replacing Richard M. Nixon as president in 1974, decided not to be on the ticket and informed the Reagan staff at 11:45 p.m. in Detroit. Ford said later that if he had had more time to negotiate what his role would have been as Reagan's vice president, he might have accepted, but that Reagan's advisers wanted a decision before midnight, saying "I felt that if we'd had a little more time, it might have worked out." Reagan then chose former U.N. Ambassador George Bush, his opponent in the primary elections, as his running mate.
- Before Ford declined to run, a number of American newspapers published early editions with the news of a Reagan-Ford presidential ticket, including the Chicago Sun-Times, with the headline "It's Reagan and Ford— Former president agrees to VP deal". The Courier-Journal of Louisville had the headline "Ford reportedly accepts No. 2 spot on GOP ticket"
- Juan Antonio Samaranch was elected President of the International Olympic Committee at the IOC's session in Moscow in the first round of voting. After the close of the Moscow games, he succeeded Lord Killanin on August 3.
- The two-day Liberty Bell Track and Field Classic opened in Philadelphia as an alternative to track and field athletics competition in the 1980 Summer Olympics. Athletes from the Olympic teams of 26 boycotting nations (and three others) competed in the U.S., three days before competition opened in Moscow. At the same time, other track stars (from boycotting and non-boycotting nations) were competing in the annual Bislett Games in Oslo. In all but two of the 19 men's events common to both games, and all of the 14 women's events, the athletes in Moscow fared better than those in Philadelphia. The exceptions were James Walker of the U.S. being faster in the 400m hurdles (48.6 seconds) than Volker Beck of East Germany (48.7) and Renaldo Nehemiah of the U.S. in the 100m hurdles (13.31 seconds) than Thomas Munkelt of East Germany (13.39). Bob Coffman of the USA commented afterward, "This meet was someone's self-serving idea to humor the athletes. You don't come to Philadelphia when the competition is in Moscow."
- Born:
  - Adam Scott, Australian professional golfer and winner of the 2013 Masters Tournament; in Adelaide, South Australia
  - Svetlana Feofanova, Russian women's pole vaulter and 2003 world champion; in Moscow, Russian SFSR, Soviet Union
  - Christina Pastor, Mexican actress in many Telenovela films

== July 17, 1980 (Thursday) ==
Suzuki

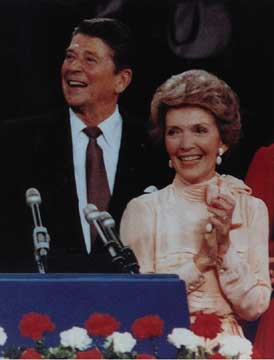
Ronald and Nancy Reagan

- Zenko Suzuki was selected as the new Prime Minister of Japan by the nation's House of Representatives, with 291 of the 511 legislators from his Liberal Democratic Party voting in his favor. Acting Prime Minister Masayoshi Ito was named by Suzuki as the new Foreign Minister.
- Lidia Gueiler Tejada, the President of Bolivia, was overthrown in a military coup and replaced by a junta led by her cousin in the Tejada family, Bolivian Army General Luis García Meza Tejada, three weeks before the Bolivian Congress was going to select a new president to resolve the lack of a majority for any of the candidates in the June election. Two days later, Meza and the other two junta members (Air Force General Waldo Bernal Pereira and Rear Admiral Ramiro Terrazas) signed a decree naming him as the new president a few hours after Gueiler went on the radio to announce her surrender of presidential authorities.
- Former Governor of California Ronald Reagan accepted his party's nomination for president at the 1980 Republican National Convention in Detroit, and told viewers in his acceptance speech, "For those who have abandoned home, we'll restore hope and we'll welcome them into a great national crusade to make America great again."
- Reverend Marjorie Matthews was selected as the first woman bishop in the United Methodist Church after 29 ballots. Reverend Matthews, whose jurisdiction was for nine states from Ohio to North Dakota, was selected in Dayton, Ohio after 29 ballots.
- An expedition sponsored by Texan oilman Jack Grimm and captained by Norman Halvorsen set off from Port Everglades, Florida, in the research vessel H.J.W. Fay in the first of several unsuccessful expeditions to try to locate the wreckage of the ocean liner RMS Titanic.
- Philippe Houvion broke the world record for the pole vault, leaping 5.77 meters (18 feet, 11 3/4 inches) His record lasted only 13 days and was broken by Władysław Kozakiewicz.
- Born:
  - Ryan Miller, American NHL goaltender and 2010 Vezina Trophy winner; in East Lansing, Michigan
  - Rashid Ramzi, Morocco-born Bahrainian runner who won the Olympic gold medal for the 1500 meter race in 2008 but was disqualified for doping; winner of two gold medals in the 2005 world championships; in Safi
  - Masato Yoshino, Japanese professional wrestler, in Higashiōsaka, Osaka
- Died: Red Barry (stage name for Donald Barry DeAcosta, 68, American film and TV actor and the first person to portray Red Ryder.

== July 18, 1980 (Friday) ==
- Rohini 1 was launched into orbit as the first satellite to be sent up by India. The launch took place from the Satish Dhawan Space Centre in Sriharikota, Andhra Pradesh state.
- Botswana's Vice President Quett Masire was selected as the permanent President of Botswana, after five days of serving as acting president following the death of Sir Seretse Khama. The National Assembly voted, 34 to 0 (with two abstentions) to approve Masire to lead the southern African nation.
- Three men made an unsuccessful assassination attempt against former Iranian Prime Minister Shapour Bakhtiar at his home in Neuilly-sur-Seine. Bakhtiar would be stabbed to death on August 6, 1991.
- Born:
  - Kristen Bell, American stage and TV actress and Saturn Award winner for the title role in Veronica Mars; in Huntington Woods, Michigan
  - Gareth Emery, British trance music producer; in Southampton

== July 19, 1980 (Saturday) ==
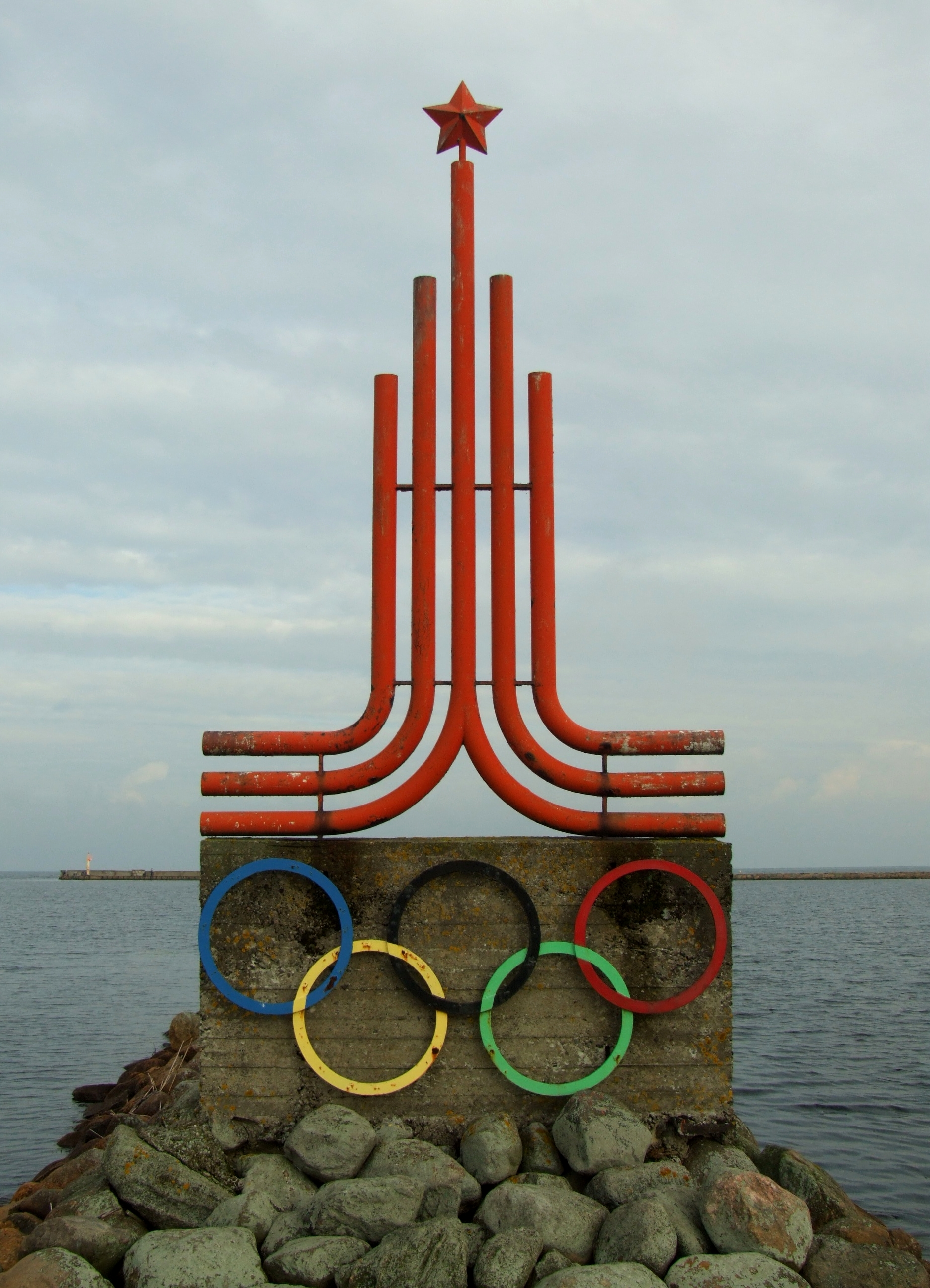
An Olympic emblem in Estonia

- The 1980 Summer Olympics began in Moscow, Soviet Union and ran until August 3. Soviet basketball star Sergei Belov lit the Olympic torch to signal the start of the Olympics. Although 81 nations sent teams to Moscow, 82 boycotted the Games in response to the Soviet invasion of Afghanistan. Athletes from 16 Olympic committees participated under a neutral flag, including three American citizens representing Puerto Rico, which had been sending a separate Olympic team since 1948.
- Former Turkish Prime Minister Nihat Erim, who served from 1971 to 1972, was killed by two gunmen in Istanbul.
- Nick Bockwinkel's reign as champion of the American Wrestling Association ended after more than four and half years after he lost to Vern Gagne in a match at Chicago's Comiskey Park.
- Born: Mark Webber, American actor, in Minneapolis
- Died: Hans Morgenthau, 76, German-born American political scientist and specialist on foreign relations.

== July 20, 1980 (Sunday) ==
- The Honduras military turned over control of the nation to a civilian government with a 71-member national assembly that had been elected on April 20. Junta leader Policarpo Paz García was then elected as the civilian President of Honduras.
- The Majlis, the first Parliament of the Islamic Republic of Iran since the overthrow of the Shah in 1979, opened its first session.
- The Soviet Union expelled the three founders of the USSR's feminist movement and flew them and their families to Austria. Since September, Tatiana Mamonova, Tatiana Goritscheva and Natalia Nalachoskaya had covertly published the unauthorized monthly magazine Women and Russia.
- Lebanon's Prime Minister Elias Sarkis named a new Prime Minister, Takieddin Solh, to succeed Salim Hoss, who had resigned in June.
- Born:
  - Gisele Bündchen, Brazilian fashion model; in Horizontina, Rio Grande do Sul state
  - Dado Dolabella, Brazilian TV actor, in Rio de Janeiro
  - Jin Goo, Korean film actor, in Seoul

== July 21, 1980 (Monday) ==
- Draft registration began in the United States for the first time since 1975, with all American men born in 1960 to register, followed the next week by those born in 1961.
- The two major U.S. labor unions for actors and actresses went on strike as 90,000 members of the Screen Actors Guild (SAG) and the American Federation of Television and Radio Artists (AFTRA) halted production in the major film and television studios, as well as the three American TV networks. The walkout began at 2:00 in the morning Pacific Time, halting production of movies and TV programs in Hollywood and in New York.
- West Germany was allowed to build a larger navy as the European Community and the North Atlantic Treaty Organization (NATO) voted to lift restrictions against German rearmament that had been in place since the end of World War II. The West German Navy was given clearance to build more submarines and larger warships, as well as nuclear-powered vessels.
- Pharmaceutical manufacturer Eli Lilly and Company announced in Indianapolis that it would begin human testing of biosynthetic insulin and, if testing was successful, would commence commercial production. The synthesis had been made with the use of recombinant DNA to direct bacteria to produce the hormone used to control diabetes.

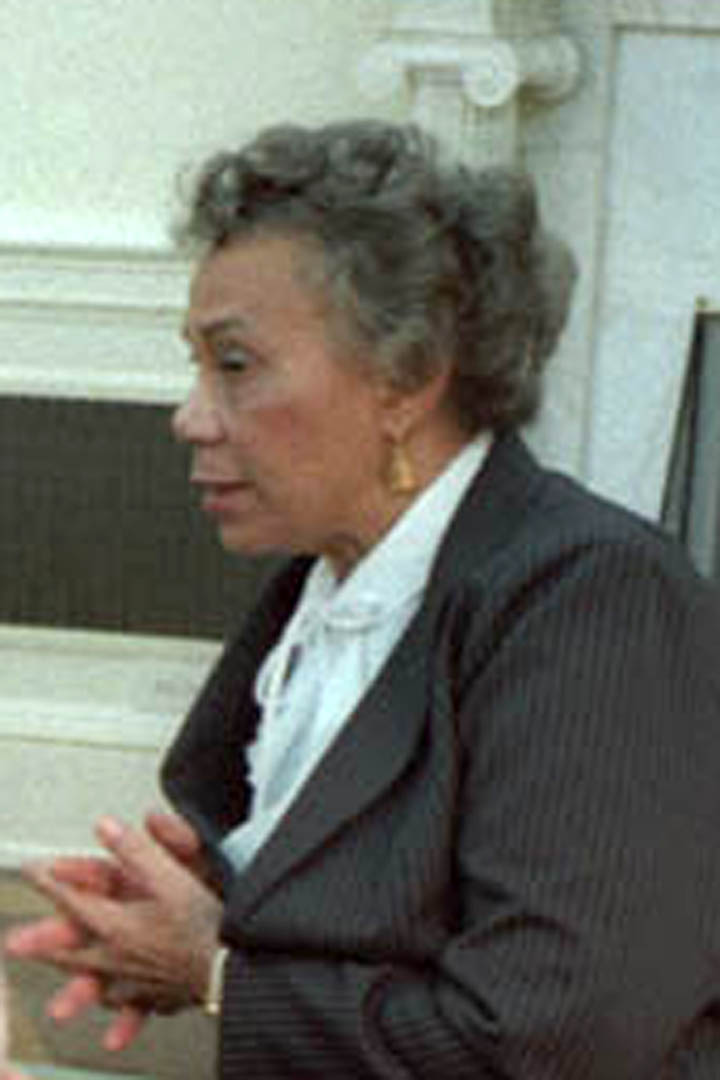
Eugenia Charles

- Elections were held in Dominica for the 21 constituent seats of the 32 member House of Assembly. The Dominica Freedom Party, led by Mary Eugenia Charles won 17 of the 21 seats in a landslide, driving out the Democratic Labor Party led by Prime Minister Oliver Seraphin.
- The New York Post, which had operated for 179 years as the world's largest-circulation afternoon daily newspaper, published its first morning edition, after publisher Rupert Murdoch announced that it would print two more morning editions along with the three published in the evening. The move came after the morning Daily News' announced that it would soon publish an afternoon edition.
- A record-breaking heat wave in the United States spread from the Midwest to the U.S. east coast, with temperatures reaching 101 °F in the shade in New York City. Temperatures in Texas had gone above 100° every day since a high-pressure system stalled over the area on June 23.
- Gymnast Nadia Comaneci of Romania, who in 1976 had become the first Olympian to receive a perfect score (10) from judges, was given another 10 at the Moscow games for her routine on the balance beam. Natalia Shaposhnikova was awarded a 10 on the same day for her performance on the vault.
- Born: CC Sabathia, American major league baseball pitcher and 2007 Cy Young Award winner; in Vallejo, California
- Died: Salah al-Din al-Bitar, 68, former Prime Minister of Syria, was murdered in Paris after his agitation against Syria's President Hafez Assad. After being called to meet a journalist at a specific time, he was ambushed by a gunman who shot him twice in the back of the head after he unlocked his office.

== July 22, 1980 (Tuesday) ==
- By a vote of 197 to 82, the House of Delegates of the American Medical Association (AMA) approved a new code of ethics that cleared the way for physicians to advertise, eliminating a stipulation that said that doctors "should not solicit patients." The new AMA code, the first since 1957, also removed the prohibition that had prohibited physicians from working with chiropractors.
- The U.S. Federal Communications Commission voted, 4 to 3, to eliminate rules that had limited the number of cable television channels that a local cable provider could provide its customers. The FCC also revoked its rules of syndication exclusivity which prohibited a cable provider from showing a syndicated program if a local TV station was carrying the same program.
- The 24-member International Whaling Commission failed to pass a worldwide moratorium against the commercial killing of whales. Although 13 members voted in favor, 9 against and 2 abstentions, the moratorium required the approval of a 3/4ths majority or 18 nations. The IWC members later voted unanimously to ban the hunting of killer whales in the waters surrounding Antarctica.
- At the Olympics in Moscow, Soviet swimmer Vladimir Salnikov became the first person to swim 1,500 meters in less than 15 minutes.
- Born:
  - Kate Ryan (stage name for Katrien Verbeeck), Belgian singer and songwriter and 2008 World Music Award winner; in Tessenderlo
  - Tablo (stage name for Daniel Armand Lee), South Korean-born Canadian hip hop artist; in Seoul
  - Dirk Kuyt, Dutch soccer football winger and Netherlands national team member; in Katwijk
- Died:
  - Ali Akbar Tabatabaei, 49, a former aide to the Shah of Iran and a vocal opponent of the Ayatollah Khomeini, was shot and killed in front of his home in Bethesda, Maryland. The killing was done by David Theodore Belfield, an African-American who had converted to Islam.
  - Kemal Türkler, 54, Turkish trade union leader, was assassinated by three gunmen, shortly after driving away from his home in Bakirkoy, a suburb of Istanbul. Türkler had been president of the Confederation of Revolutionary Trade Unions, the nation's largest labor union for miners and metalworkers.
  - Hans-Georg Bürger, 28, West German Formula II race car driver, died two days after crashing during warm-up laps hours before the European Championship Grand Prix was to start in Zandvoort near Amsterdam.

== July 23, 1980 (Wednesday) ==
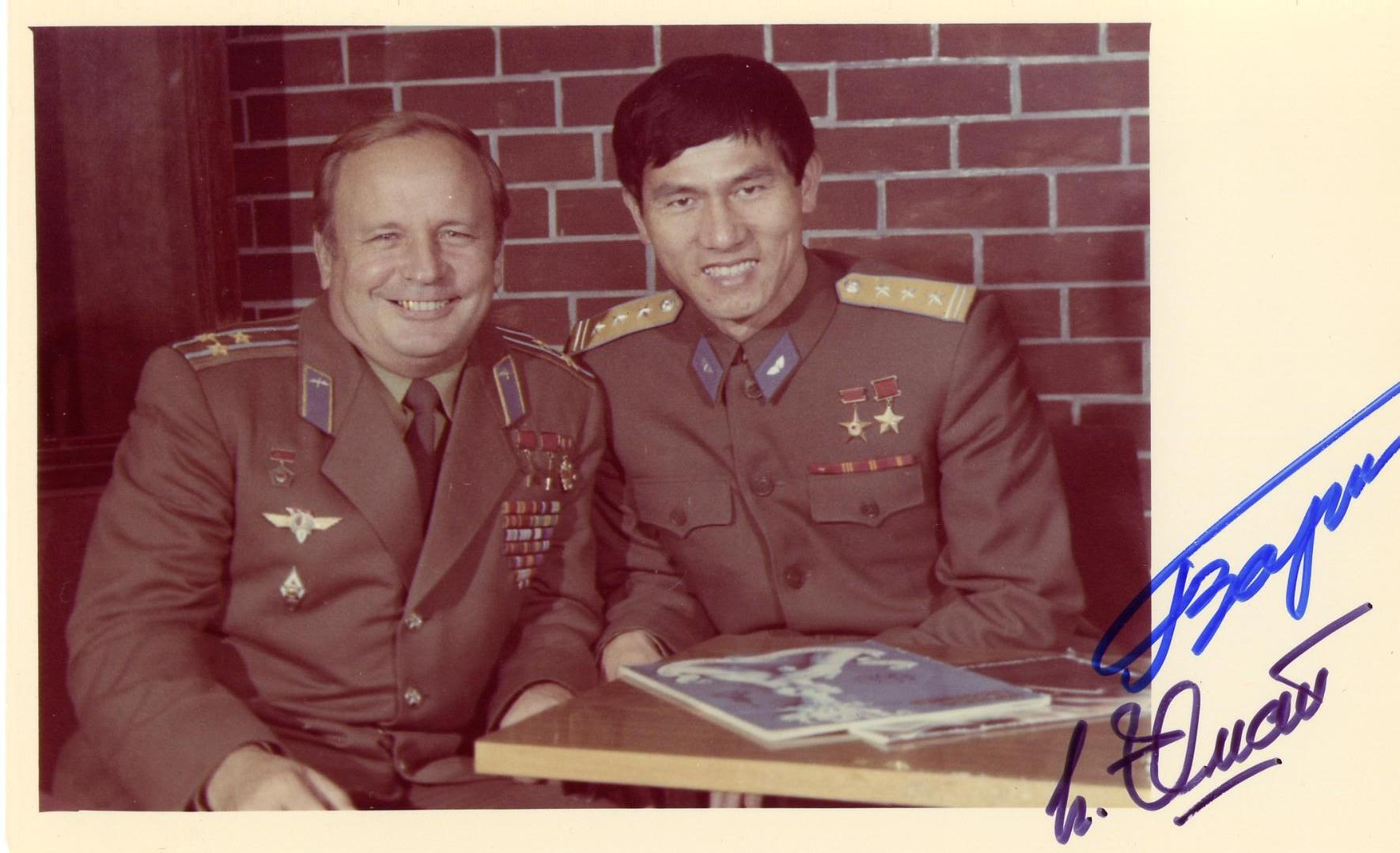
Gorbatko and Pham

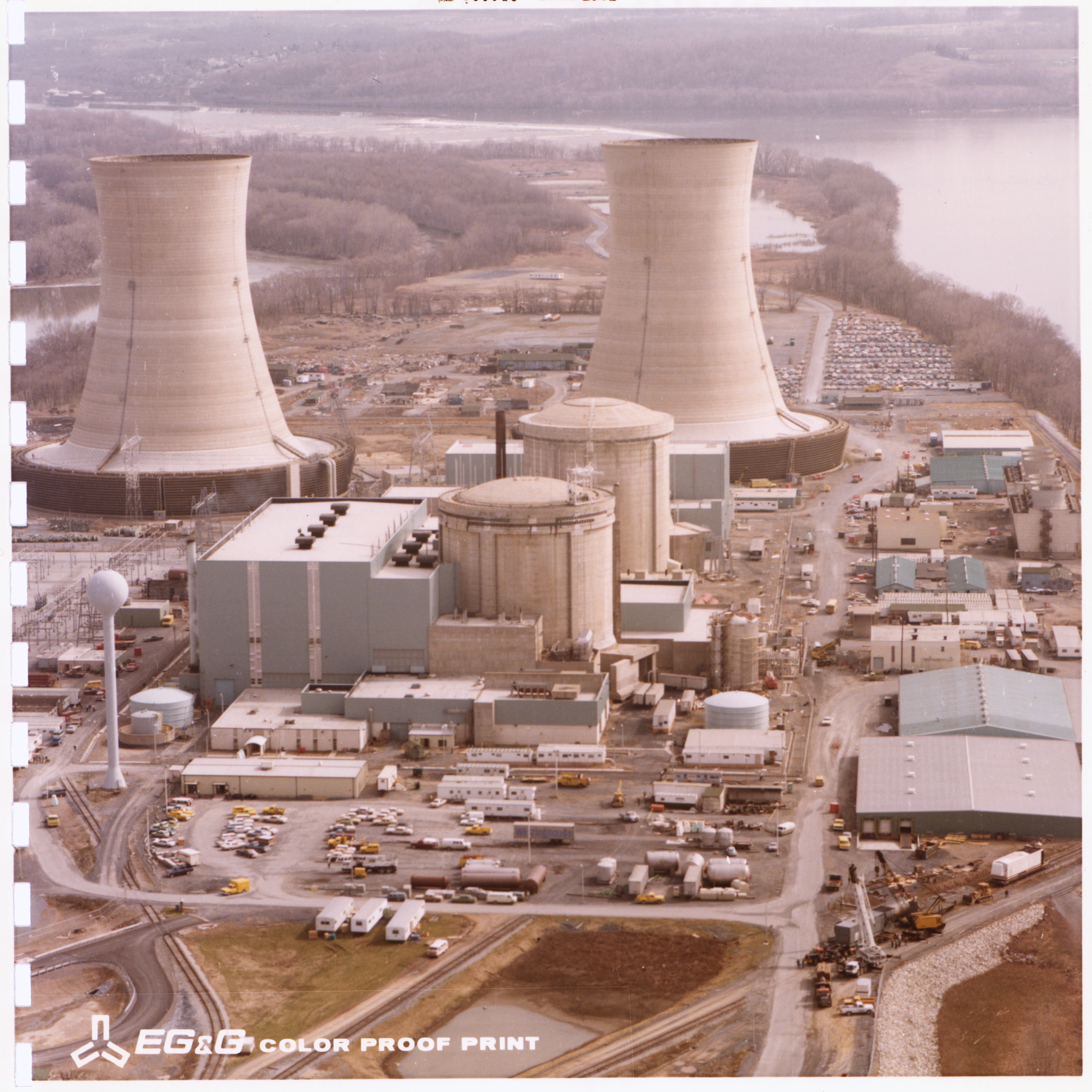
TMI-2

- Lieutenant Colonel Phạm Tuân became the first Vietnamese cosmonaut after being launched into space with Viktor Gorbatko on Soyuz 37. He remained in space for slightly less than 8 days and returned to Earth on July 31.
- Two volunteers, William Behrle III and Michael Benson, became the first people in almost 16 months to set foot inside the radioactively contaminated Three Mile Island Nuclear Generating Station. Wearing radiation suits, the two nuclear technicians made the first onsite review of the TMI-2 reactor containment building located in Londonderry Township, Pennsylvania, near Harrisburg for the first time since the March 28, 1979 meltdown of a nuclear reactor and stayed for 20 minutes, measuring radiation levels, conducting a visual inspection and removing some contaminated equipment for testing. A follow-up inspection was made on August 15 as Behrle and Benson were accompanied by two other volunteer technicians.
- A 66-day hunger strike by jailed Irish Republican Army commander Martin Meehan ended after Meehan agreed to take nourishment following a personal appeal by Cardinal Tomas O Fiaich, who said that Meehan's death would provoke bloodshed in Northern Ireland.
- Died:
  - Riad Taha, 53, Lebanese newspaper publisher, was assassinated by gunmen while driving through Beirut. During Taha's funeral procession, 14 people were killed and 21 seriously wounded in a shootout between Shia and Sunni Muslims.
  - Keith Godchaux, 32, keyboardist for the Grateful Dead, died four days after being severely injured in an auto accident. Godchaux had been a passenger in a car that slammed into a parked flatbed truck near Ross, California.
  - Helen Hagnes Mintiks, 30, a violinist for the Metropolitan Opera orchestra in New York, was murdered during an intermission of a performance of the visiting Deutsche Oper Berlin ballet troupe. At 9:30, she left the women's locker room and told a friend that she was walking to the dressing room of the ballet's star, Valery Panov, but never arrived. Her body was found the next morning in a ventilating shaft at the Lincoln Center. Craig Crimmins, a stagehand at the Met, was arrested six weeks later and ultimately confessed to strangling Mintiks.

== July 24, 1980 (Thursday) ==
- A team of 200 French paratroopers and British Marines arrived on the island of Espiritu Santo in the New Hebrides chain in the South Pacific Ocean, bringing an end to a rebellion that had been started when Jimmy Stevens and other rebels had declared the island independent as the "Republic of Vemerana". Rebel tribesmen laid down their bows and arrows and warmly greeted the invading troops, clearing the way for the island to rejoin the New Hebrides six days before the chain was granted independence as the Republic of Vanuatu, and rebel leader Jimmy Stevens and his followers fled into the jungle.
- Olga Rukavishnikova set a record for shortest-lived world record in the final event of the Women's pentathlon at the 1980 Summer Olympics. She crossed the finish line first in the 800 meter race for 4,937 decathlon points, beating the old record of 4,856 points. But 0.4 seconds later, Nadiya Tkachenko's second-place finish set a new record of 5,083 points.
- Johannesburg, South Africa’s largest and most industrialised city, faced the largest strike by migrant municipal workers. More than 10 000 African municipal workers participated in the walkout.
- Died:
  - Peter Sellers, 54, English film actor and comedian, two days after a heart attack
  - Uttam Kumar (stage name for Arun Kumar Chatterjee), 53, Indian film actor and director and the most popular star of Bengali cinema

== July 25, 1980 (Friday) ==
- As Honduras made its transition from military rule by a junta to civilian rule by an elected president, the Honduran Assembly voted to select the junta leader, General Policarpo Paz García, as the civilian government president, until the newly elected Constituent Assembly could approve a new constitution for the Central American republic. The 71-member unicameral parliament, with 35 Liberal Party, 33 Nationalist Party, and three from the Innovation Party, was unanimous in keeping General Paz.
- Born: Cha Du-ri, German and South Korean pro soccer football striker for the Bundesliga and for the South Korean national team; in Frankfurt
- Died:
  - Juliane Plambeck and Wolfgang Beer, West German terrorists, were killed in a traffic accident near Bietigheim-Bissingen. Plambeck was driving near Stuttgart when her car collided head-on with a large truck coming from the other direction. Police found two sub-machine guns, three large caliber handguns and several forged passports in the wreckage of her Volkswagen Golf car. Plambeck had been sought by police for five years after the murder of West Berlin judge Gunter von Drenkmann.
  - Vladimir Vysotsky, 42, Soviet singer and songwriter; from a heart attack
  - Erich Fuchs, 78, convicted German war criminal who served four years in prison for being an accessory to the murder of 79,000 Jewish prisoners at the Sobibor extermination camp.

== July 26, 1980 (Saturday) ==
- A fire at the Brinley Inn, a boarding home for elderly people and outpatients from state mental hospitals, mentally handicapped residents of Bradley Beach, New Jersey, killed 24 people. The blaze started in a lounge in front of the four-story home near the ocean. Most of the residents had not been shown how to reach the fire escape, and many of the dead had locked themselves in their rooms after being unable to find the front door.
- Born:
  - Jacinda Ardern, Prime Minister of New Zealand since 2017; in Hamilton, North Island
  - Madeleine West, Australian TV actress, in Melbourne.
- Died: Allen Hoskins, 59, African-American child actor who portrayed "Farina" in first series of Our Gang (The Little Rascals) film shorts, from cancer.

== July 27, 1980 (Sunday) ==
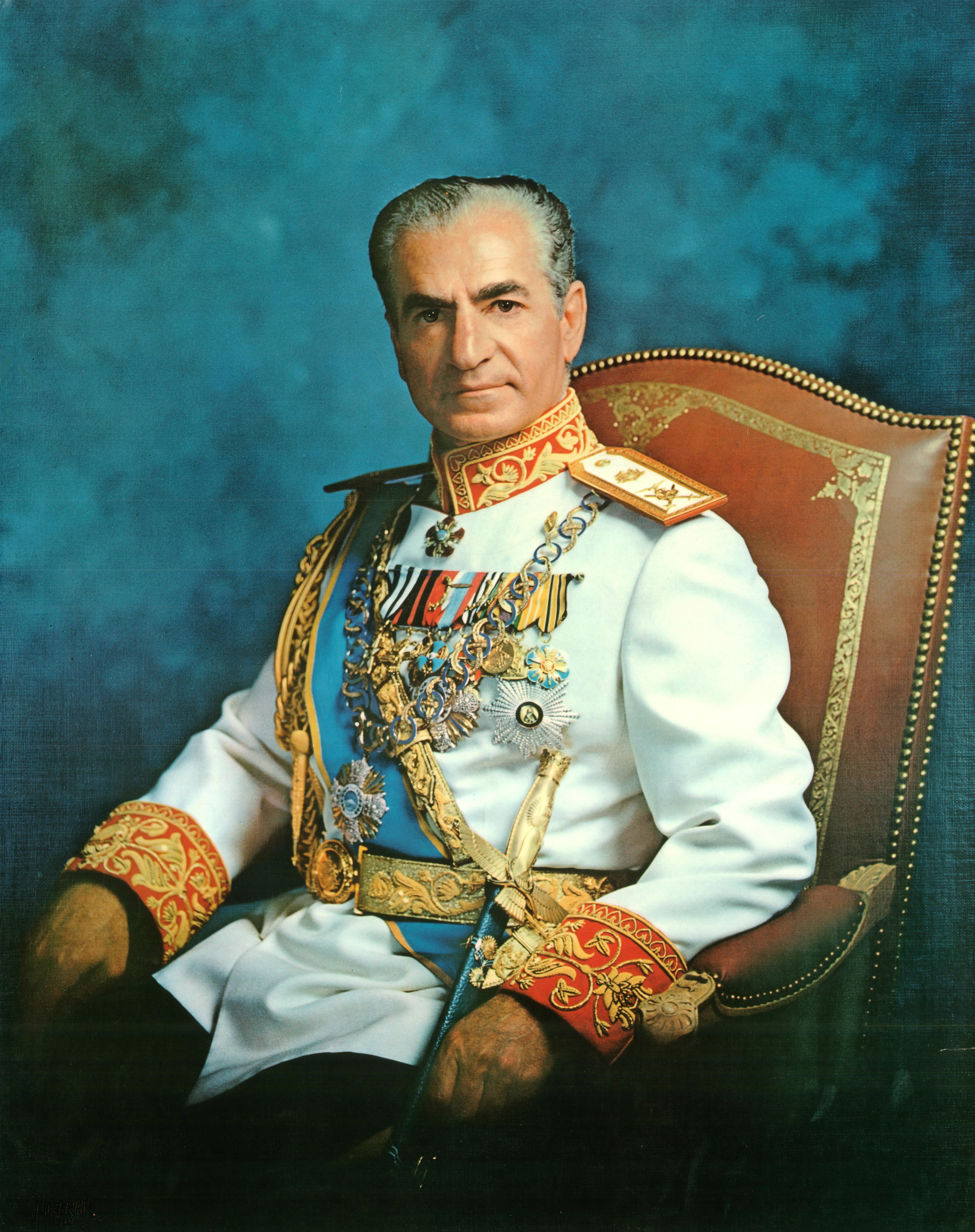
The Shah in 1973

- Mohammad Reza Pahlavi, 60, deposed Shah of Iran, died in Cairo from complications of lymphatic cancer. The former absolute monarch, "hailed by some as a tough but progressive leader of a backward country and reviled by many as one of the worst tyrants of modern times" had been living at the Kubbeh Palace with his family since March 24 as the guest of Egypt's President Anwar Sadat, and succumbed at the Maadi Military Hospital. Los Angeles Times reporter said of the Shah, "In the end, he was an almost pathetic figure, despised by most of his former subjects, shunned by many world leaders with whom he had hobnobbed and, despite a huge fortune, essentially powerless to choose his place of exile. Echoing what most Iranians felt about their former monarch, Tehran Radio interrupted its regular programming and announced "Mohammed Reza Pahlavi, the bloodsucker of the century, has died at last."
- A Palestinian terrorist killed a 17-year-old boy and injured 20 other people by throwing grenades at a group of 40 Jewish teenagers in Antwerp in Belgium. The group of students from Austria, the Netherlands, Britain and France, was standing in front of the Agoudath Israel cultural center in Antwerp and was waiting to board a bus for the camp at the Ardennes Hills.
- A vote to impeach Italy's Prime Minister Francesco Cossiga, on charges of using his office to prevent the son of a political ally from being arrested for terrorism, failed in a joint vote of the 630-member Chamber of Deputies and the 321-member Senate of the Republic. Only 370 were in favor and 535 were against the resolution, which would have been tried by the criminal division of Italy's highest court, the Corte Suprema di Cassazione.
- Born:
  - Jessi Combs, American Land speed racer; in Rockerville, South Dakota (killed in high speed auto crash, 2019)
  - Dolph Ziggler (ring name for Nicholas Nemeth), American professional wrestler and comedian; in Cleveland

== July 28, 1980 (Monday) ==
- Fernando Belaúnde Terry was sworn into office as the 66th President of Peru, almost 12 years after his overthrow in 1968 by a military coup d'état, as General Francisco Morales-Bermúdez turned control of the South American nation's government from military rule to civilian rule.
- John Favara, who had accidentally struck and killed the son of New York City mob boss John Gotti on March 18, disappeared after leaving work in New Hyde Park, New York on Long Island. According to witnesses, three men confronted Favara as he was getting into his car, clubbed him, and threw him into a van. Three .22 caliber cartridges were found at the scene, suggesting that the 51-year-old Favara had been executed at the scene. Favara's body was never located.
- Died: Maria Luisa Monteiro da Cunha, 71, Brazilian librarian

== July 29, 1980 (Tuesday) ==
Flag of Iran

the former flag

- Former Burmese Prime Minister U Nu was allowed to return to Burma (now Myanmar) under an amnesty granted by President Ne Win.
- The Islamic Republic of Iran officially adopted a new flag, retaining the green, white and red stripes used by the Imperial State of Iran, but with a new emblem and with the phrase "Allahu akbar" written in Persian script repeated 22 times across the border of the stripes.
- Born: Rachel Miner, American TV and film actress, later the wife of actor Macaulay Culkin; in New York City

== July 30, 1980 (Wednesday) ==
- The Republic of Vanuatu, formerly the territory of the New Hebrides, gained independence after 74 years of administration by the United Kingdom and France. Reverend Walter Lini was sworn into office as the republic's first Prime Minister and Ati George Sokomanu took the oath as the ceremonial President.
- Israel's parliament, the Knesset, annexed East Jerusalem formerly Jordanian territory that had been captured 13 years earlier in the Six-Day War of 1967. Sponsored by "ultranationalist" Geula Cohen, the Jerusalem Law was approved, 69 to 15, with 3 abstentions, legalizing the reunification of Jerusalem, although a reporter for The New York Times noted that the action "does nothing to change the city's de facto status."
- British Prime Minister Margaret Thatcher and her government withstood a vote of censure within the House of Commons after a contentious six-hour debate. The vote was 274 in favor and 333 against.
- Władysław Kozakiewicz of Poland broke the world record for the pole vault with vault of 5.75 meters (18 feet, 11½ inches) at the 1980 Summer Olympics in Moscow.
- J. R. Richard, the star pitcher for the Houston Astros major league baseball team, collapsed after suffering a stroke during a light workout at the Houston Astrodome, ending his ten-season career.

== July 31, 1980 (Thursday) ==
- The Iranian government executed 24 men at Evin Prison in Tehran, including ten former members of the Iranian armed forces and a civilian who had been convicted on Tuesday of an attempted coup d'état. The other 13 included a former chief of the SAVAK secret police; a Jewish hotel administrator of Tehran's Royal Garden Hotel, who was convicted of "spying for Israel"; and three heroin dealers. All 24 were shot at dawn by a firing squad in the prison.
- Italy's Prime Minister Francesco Cossiga and his government easily won a vote of confidence in Parliament, with 325 supporting him and 270 against. Cossiga himself called the vote after his judicial reforms were called into question by the Communist-led coalition.
- Died:
  - Mohammed Rafi, 55, Indian pop singer, from a heart attack
  - Pascual Jordan, 77, German theoretical physicist
  - Bobby Van (stage name for Robert Stein), 50, stage, film and TV actor, from a brain tumor
