= June 1980 =

Month of 1980

| << | June 1980 | | | | | >> |
| Su | Mo | Tu | We | Th | Fr | Sa |
| 1 | 2 | 3 | 4 | 5 | 6 | 7 |
| 8 | 9 | 10 | 11 | 12 | 13 | 14 |
| 15 | 16 | 17 | 18 | 19 | 20 | 21 |
| 22 | 23 | 24 | 25 | 26 | 27 | 28 |
| 29 | 30 |

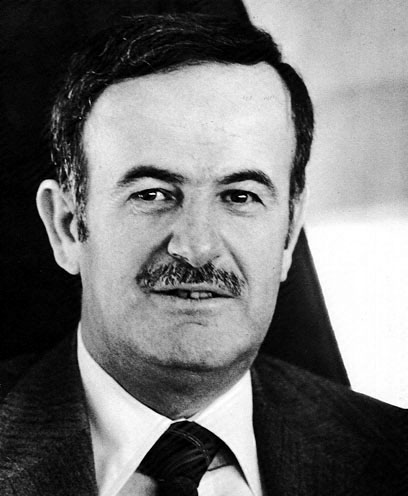
June 25, 1980: Syria's Assad survives attack

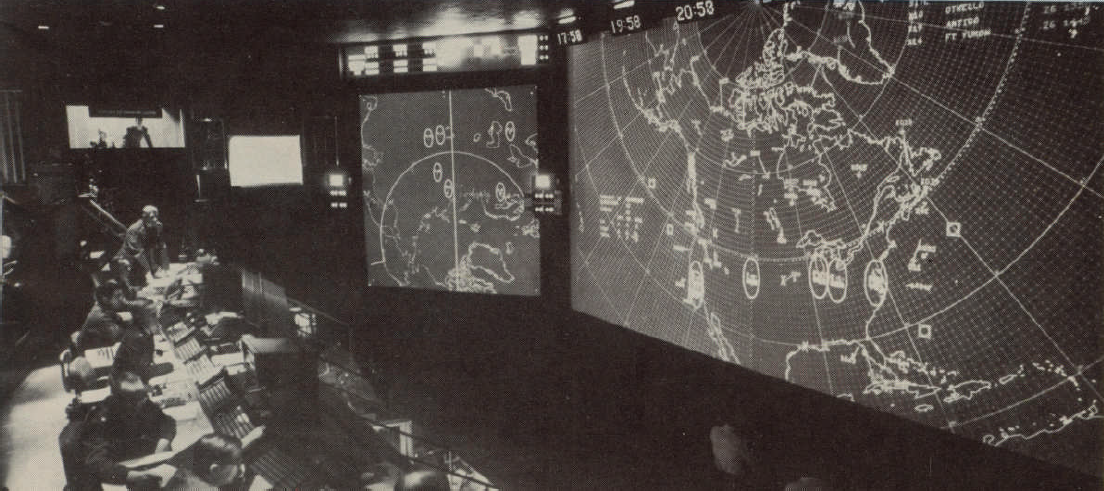
June 3, 1980: NORAD gets false nuclear attack warning

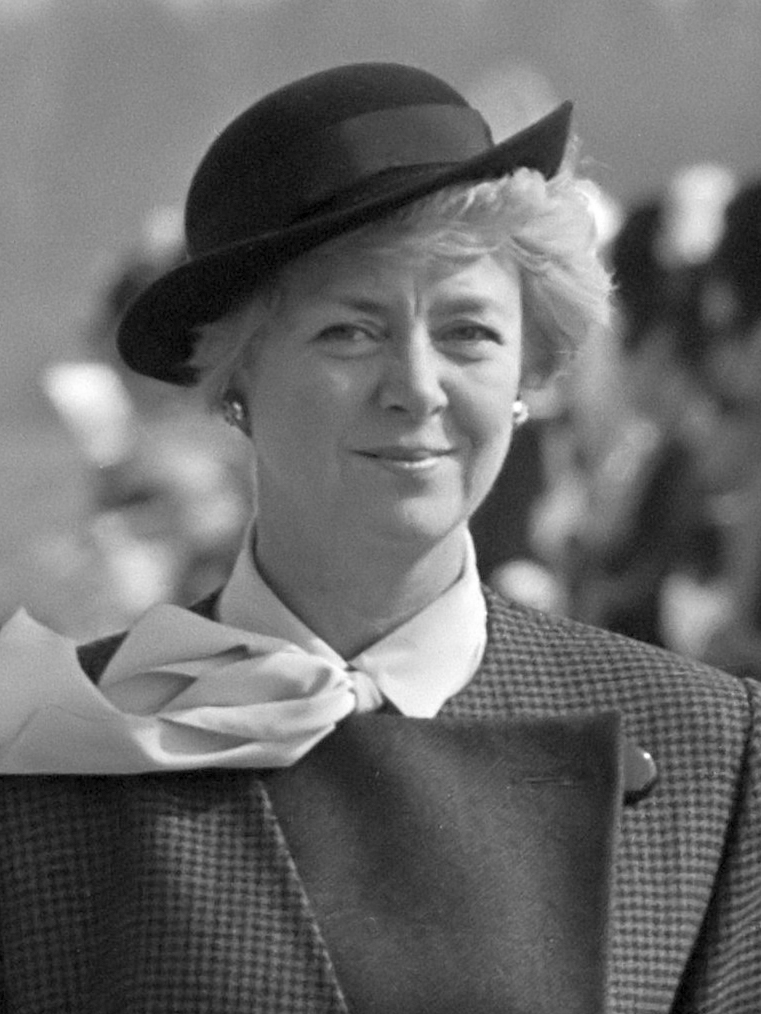
June 28, 1980: Iceland elects its first woman President, Vigdis Finnbogadottir

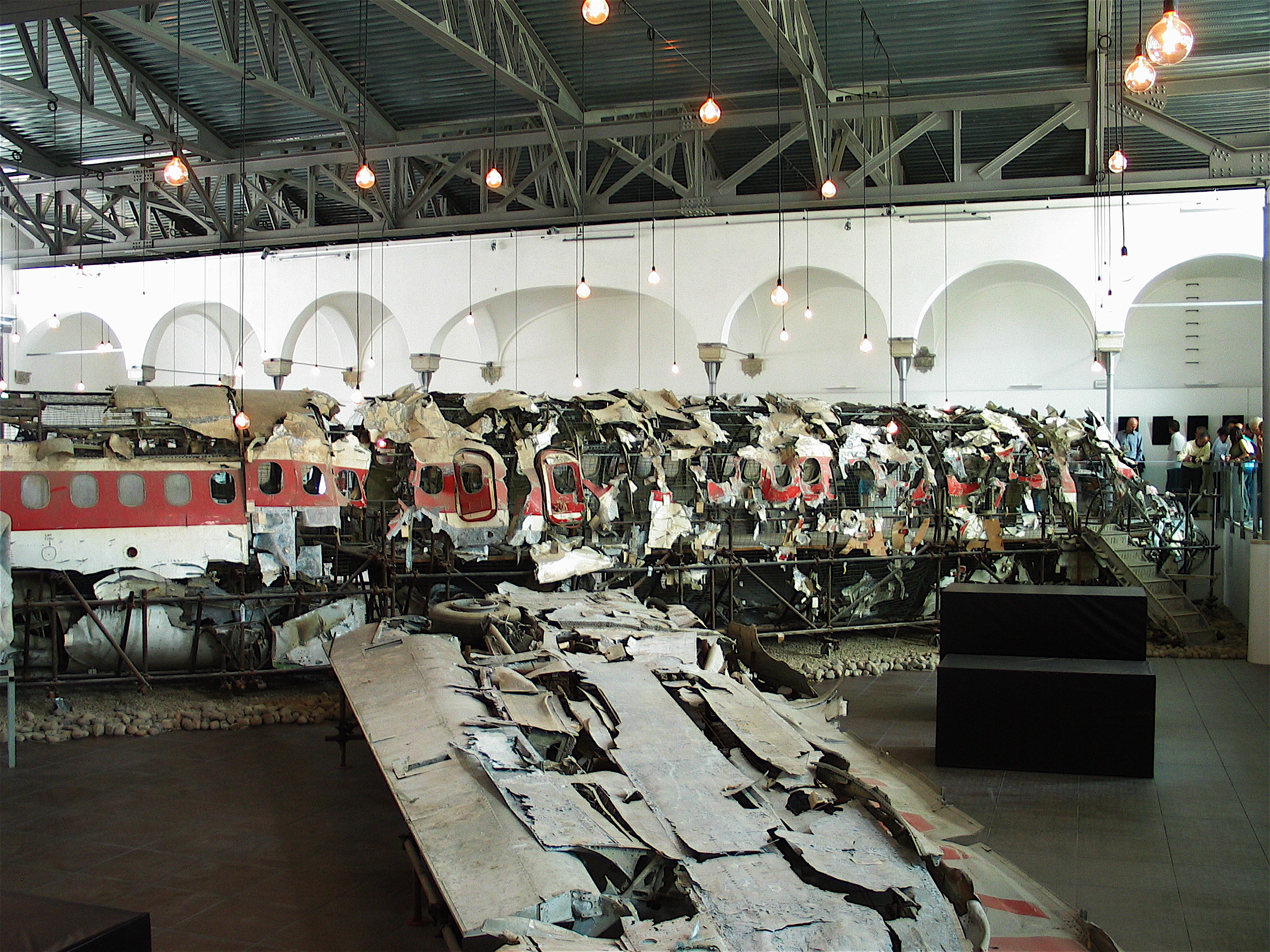
June 27, 1980: Itavia Flight 870 crash kills 81

The following events happened in June 1980:

== June 1, 1980 (Sunday) ==
- The first 24-hour news channel, Cable News Network (CNN), was launched. The U.S.-based network launched at 6:00 p.m. Eastern Time from Atlanta with an original staff of 170 employees, and 130 more in bureaus in Chicago, Dallas, Los Angeles, New York City, San Francisco and Washington, D.C. The inaugural broadcast on the channel was an introduction by Ted Turner. Following the introduction and a pre-recorded version of "The Star-Spangled Banner" performed by three military bands, the husband and wife team of Dave Walker and Lois Hart anchored the channel's first newscast at 6:05 with a live report from Fort Wayne, Indiana, about reaction there to the wounding of civil rights leader Vernon Jordan. Among the first segments was a videotaped interview with then-President Jimmy Carter by Daniel Schorr. At the beginning, CNN was available to two million households that had cable television and whose provider carried the channel.
- Rioting broke out at the Cuban refugee center at Fort Chaffee, Arkansas after 200 stationed inside broke through the front gates and threw rocks at soldiers and local law enforcement officers. At least 15 officers were injured, along with four refugees and a civilian. The refugees retreated after troopers fired 20 shots from pistols and shotguns.
- Full-time color television broadcasting began in Venezuela on the Venevisión network and on Radio Caracas Television.
- The suicidal pilot of an air taxi killed himself and nine other people in Barra do Garças, Mato Grosso state. Mauro Milhomem had taken on four government officials as passengers in an Embraer Sertanejo-721 plane for the Taxi Aereo Garapu service and then crashed after an unsuccessful attempt to crash into the hotel where his wife was staying. All four of his passengers were killed, and five employees of an accounting firm died when Milhomem's airplane impacted a two-story building.
- Thierry Vigneron broke the world record for the pole vault, surpassing the mark of Władysław Kozakiewicz with a vault of 5.75 meters (18 feet, 10 3/8 inches) at the French Club championships in Colombes. Vigneron tipped the bar as he leapt over it, but it stayed in place.
- The All-Ireland Hurling championship was played, as Castlegar of Galway defeated McQuillan's of Antrim 1–11 to 1–8.
- Died:
  - Arthur C. Nielsen, 83, American market researcher and founder of the A.C. Nielsen survey that tracks viewing preferences and issues the Nielsen ratings measurements for television programming.
  - Rube Marquard, 93, American baseball pitcher and inductee into the Baseball Hall of Fame.

== June 2, 1980 (Monday) ==
- In South Africa, the oil plants at Sasolburg was attacked by Umkhonto we Sizwe, the African National Congress's (ANC) military wing. They bombed two strategically important SASOL (oil-from-coal) plants and an oil refinery.
- Bassam Shakaa, the Palestinian Mayor of Nablus, Ibrahim Tawil, the mayor of Al-Bireh, and Karim Khalaf, the mayor of Ramallah were all victims of car bombs placed by the terror group Jewish Underground. Khalaf lost one leg, while Shakaa had to have both legs amputated. Moshe Zer, one of the first Israeli settlers in the northern West Bank, was the person who led the Jewish underground "hit team" that tried to assassinate Shakaa. Zer was convicted for causing serious injury and belonging to a terror group, but was sentenced to only four months in prison.
- Hernán Siles Zuazo, the former President of Bolivia and the front runner in the June 29 presidential election, avoided catastrophe after prior commitments led him to cancel plans for flying with six colleagues on a private plane. Siles Zuazo's running mate, Jaime Paz Zamora, was the only person to survive the crash of a twin-engine Piper aircraft, which lost its right engine shortly after taking off from La Paz.
- The New Orleans Times-Picayune newspaper merged with its only competitor, the New Orleans States-Item and published as The Times-Picayune/States-Item. Effective October 1, 1986, the newspaper was known again as the Times Picayune.
- Chinese Jesuit and Roman Catholic bishop Dominic Tang (born Tang Yiming) was released from a Chinese prison after more than 21 years. Tang had been arrested on February 5, 1958 by the Communist Chinese government and was charged by the People's Republic as being "the most faithful running-dog of the reactionary Vatican" and held in a labor camp, without ever being brought to trial. Later appointed by Pope John Paul II as the Archbishop of Guangzhou, Tang would live 15 more years after his release before his death in 1995.
- Died: Frank Coe, 73, former U.S. Treasury Department official and the first Director of the International Monetary Fund until he was identified as a member of the U.S. Communist Party. He defected to China in 1958 and died in Beijing.

== June 3, 1980 (Tuesday) ==
- A computer communications device failure caused warning messages to sporadically flash at North American Aerospace Defense Command and U.S. Air Force command posts around the world that a Soviet nuclear attack was taking place. The malfunction happened again on June 6. The false alert would provide inspiration for the 1983 film WarGames.
- The number of Cuban refugees arriving at Key West, Florida through the Mariel Boatlift reached 100,000— one percent of the population of Cuba— after a boat arrived with 65 additional people. All of the refugees were arrested, along with the skipper of the ship. On the same day, the largest number of Cubans to be unloaded since the boatlift started arrived on the freighter Red Diamond V, which carried 731 people.

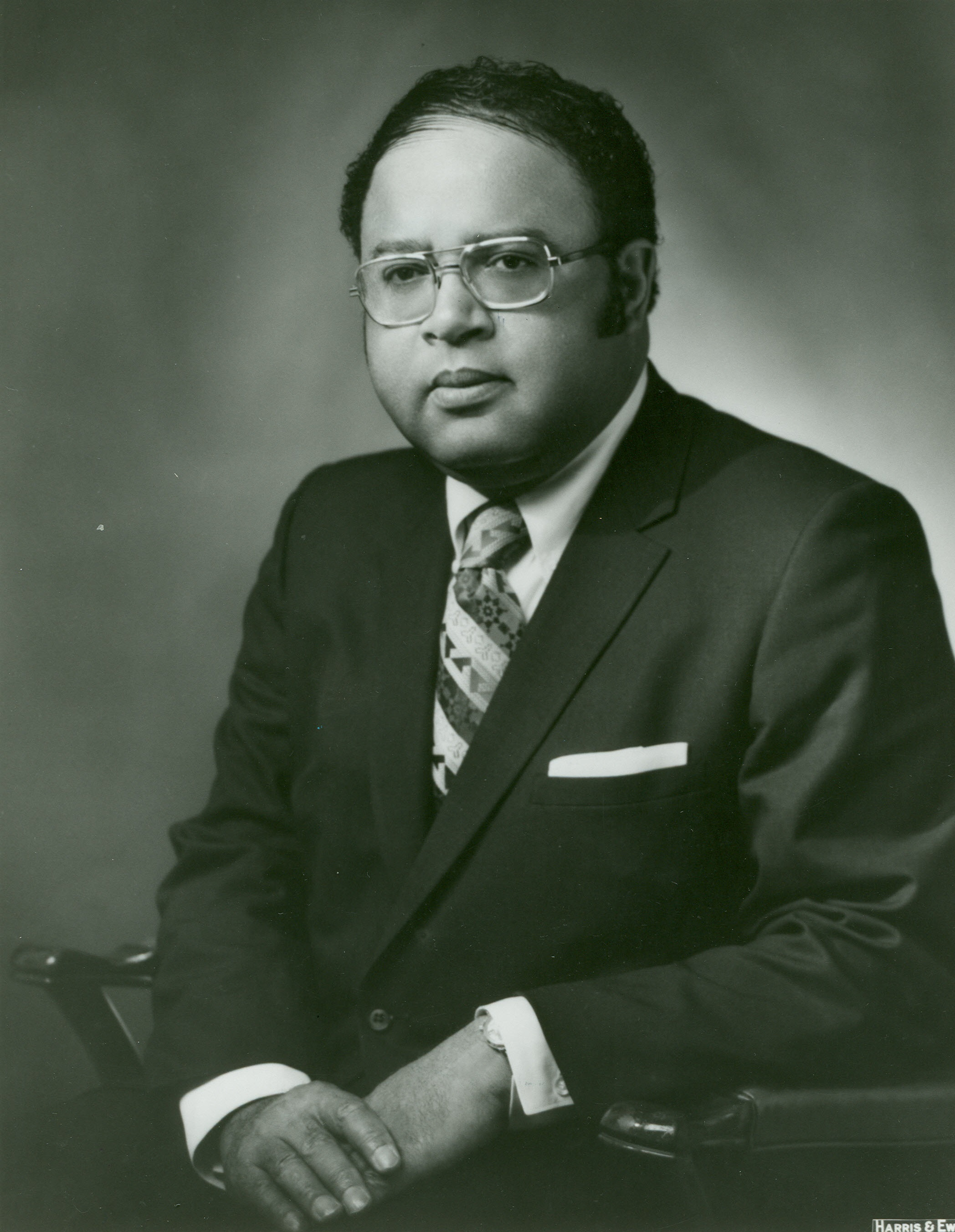
Diggs

- Charles C. Diggs, the first African American elected to Congress from Michigan (in 1955) and the longest-serving black U.S. Representative up until that time, resigned from Congress one day after losing the appeal of his 1978 conviction on 11 counts of mail fraud and filing false payroll forms. On July 24, Diggs began a three-year prison sentence at the minimum security federal prison camp at Maxwell Air Force Base in Montgomery, Alabama, and would be paroled after 14 months.
- In primary elections for the Democratic Party in eight U.S. states, Democratic challenger Teddy Kennedy defeated President Jimmy Carter in California, New Jersey, Rhode Island and South Dakota, but Carter's wins in Ohio, West Virginia, New Mexico and Montana yielded him 334 delegates, putting him past the 1,666 needed to capture the nomination on the first ballot at the Democratic National Convention.
- A series of seven tornadoes touched down in or near the city of Grand Island, Nebraska, destroying 600 structures in and around the city and injuring 200 people. Because of early warnings, only five people died.
- For the first time since it was erected in 1886, the Statue of Liberty sustained damage from a bomb. The explosion happened at 7:25 in the evening, 70 minutes after the last ferry boat of tourists had left. Nobody was injured, but the bomb destroyed several exhibits in a museum in the base of the statue.
- Born: Tamim bin Hamad Al Thani, Emir of Qatar since 2013; in Doha
- Died: Fred Lieb, 92, American journalist and the first sportswriter to be inducted into the Baseball Hall of Fame

== June 4, 1980 (Wednesday) ==
- In West Germany, a contingent of 5,000 police and border guards used water cannons and bulldozers to end a protest that had started on May 3 near the village of Gorleben, where a nuclear waste dump was to be constructed near the border with East Germany. About 1,300 protesters made a settlement of 70 huts and tents and declared their site the "Free Republic of Wendland" in order to stop construction teams from the first stage of construction, the drilling of test holes. In the early morning hours, the troops surrounded and then evicted the occupiers.
- John Turnley, Chairman of the Irish Independence Party, and a leading Protestant politician in Northern Ireland, was assassinated in the village of Carnlough as he was walking down the steps of the village meeting hall. A group of three masked men, suspected of being members of a Protestant militant group, fired submachine guns at Turnley and struck him in the head and the chest. Turnley had advocated the reunification of British-controlled and predominantly Protestant Northern Ireland with the predominantly Catholic Republic of Ireland.
- Metro-Goldwyn-Mayer Film Company (MGM) and the Columbia Broadcasting System (CBS) announced the formation of MGM-CBS Home Video, a joint venture to sell VHS and Betamax videotapes, and video discs, of many of MGM's 1,600 films and CBS's television shows for customers to view at home on their own television sets.
- Britain's premier horse race, the Epsom Derby, was won by Henbit, ridden by Willie Carson. The thoroughbred horse had stumbled 1 1/2 furlongs from the finish line and finished, injured, 3/4 of a length ahead of Master Willie.
- Real Madrid beat their own reserve team, Real Madrid Castilla, to win Spain's national championship tournament, the Copa del Rey, before 65,000 people in Madrid.
- Fortuna Düsseldorf defeated 1. FC Köln, 2–1, to win the DFB-Pokal Cub, West Germany's national championship tournament.
- Fifteen hours before his scheduled execution in the electric chair, convicted murderer Jack Howard Potts changed his mind about an earlier refusal to appeal his death sentence. Potts, who had murdered an auto mechanic in 1973, was on death row at the Georgia State Prison in Reidsville, Georgia, and was scheduled to be electrocuted the morning at 10:00, after a federal judge concluded that there was no basis for a stay of execution. The electrocution would have been the first use of capital punishment in Georgia in more than 15 years. The U.S. state of Georgia would resume executions in 1983. After Potts made his decision at 7:08 p.m. to let the American Civil Liberties Union appeal the death warrant, he lived for 25 more years before dying of liver cancer on September 2, 2005 at a prison hospital.
- Former Ugandan dictator Idi Amin gave his first — and only — interview from exile, after having been removed from power in 1979. Amin was questioned in his new home in Jeddah, Saudi Arabia, by BBC Reporter Brian Barron.
- Died:
  - Earle R. MacAusland, 90, founder of the first monthly publication devoted to cooking and wine selection, Gourmet magazine.
  - Charles Miller, 41, American saxophonist for the band War, was killed during a robbery.

== June 5, 1980 (Thursday) ==
- Soyuz T-2 was launched from the Soviet Union with cosmonauts Yury Malyshev and Vladimir Aksyonov and docked with the Salyut 6 space station. "Two cosmonauts launched in new-model Soyuz. The launch marked the first crewed mission using the new Soyuz-T spacecraft that was equipped with a newer computer system that allowed the cosmonauts more independence from ground control at Baikonur. Malyshev and Aksyonov returned to Earth four days later after undocking from the space station.
- Manipur University, located in Imphal in the Indian state of Manipur, was established by state law.
- Gulf and Western Industries (G+W) unveiled what it described as "a major breakthrough in electric car technology", powered by a zinc chloride battery. G+W President Jim Judelson told reporters at a press conference in New York that the battery would hold a charge for up to eight hours and permit speeds of up to 65 miles per hour (105 km/h) after a slow acceleration (30 miles per hour (48 km/h) in 9.8 seconds) and would have a range of 150 miles (240 km) before it would need recharging. The U.S. Department of Energy (DOE) had invested $15 million in the project and initially predicted that by the year 2000, 39% of American automobiles could be electric vehicles. By September, the DOE announced that the ZnCl battery (which could be recharged only by highly trained personnel) was a disappointment, with 65% less power than predicted, having a range of only 90 miles (140 km).
- Twenty bus passengers were killed and 13 others injured when their Trailways bus failed to negotiate a dangerous curve and plunged 50 feet down a wooded ravine near Jasper, Arkansas.
- Died: Giorgio Amendola, 72, prominent Italian Communist Party member of parliament since 1945

== June 6, 1980 (Friday) ==
- The U.S. Senate voted, 68 to 10, to override President Carter's veto of a bill banning a 10 cent per gallon tax on gasoline announced by Carter in March, and poised to take effect on July 1. The day before, the U.S. House of Representatives had voted, 335 to 34, to override the veto, and the Senate's action banned the fee and marked the first time since 1952 that a Democrat-controlled Congress had overridden a Democrat U.S. president. On June 4, both houses of Congress had voted overwhelmingly (367 to 30 and 73 to 16) to pass the measure that Carter vetoed.
- The film Urban Cowboy premiered in the United States. Adapted from a 1978 article written by screenwriter Aaron Latham in Esquire magazine and starring John Travolta and Debra Winger, the film was notable for creating a U.S. fad of riding a "mechanical bull", a feature of metropolitan taverns playing country music in imitation of Gilley's Club, a honky-tonk in the Houston suburb of Pasadena, Texas.
- Born:
  - Pete Hegseth, American National Army Guard officer, political commentator, and author, 29th U.S Secretary of Defense (2025-present), in Minneapolis
  - Mmusi Maimane, Leader of the Opposition in South Africa's National Assembly from 2014 to 2019; in Krugersdorp
- Died: Gualtiero De Angelis, 80, Italian voice actor who did the Italian language dubbing of the roles of lead actors in major films, particularly the films of James Stewart

== June 7, 1980 (Saturday) ==
- Selim Hoss announced his resignation as Prime Minister of Lebanon after four years, along with his 12-member cabinet.
- Sixty-seven people were killed in Empangeni in South Africa when the bus they were on was struck by a high-speed train at an unguarded railroad crossing. Packed with shoppers, mostly black African, the bus was cut in half by the impact of the train.

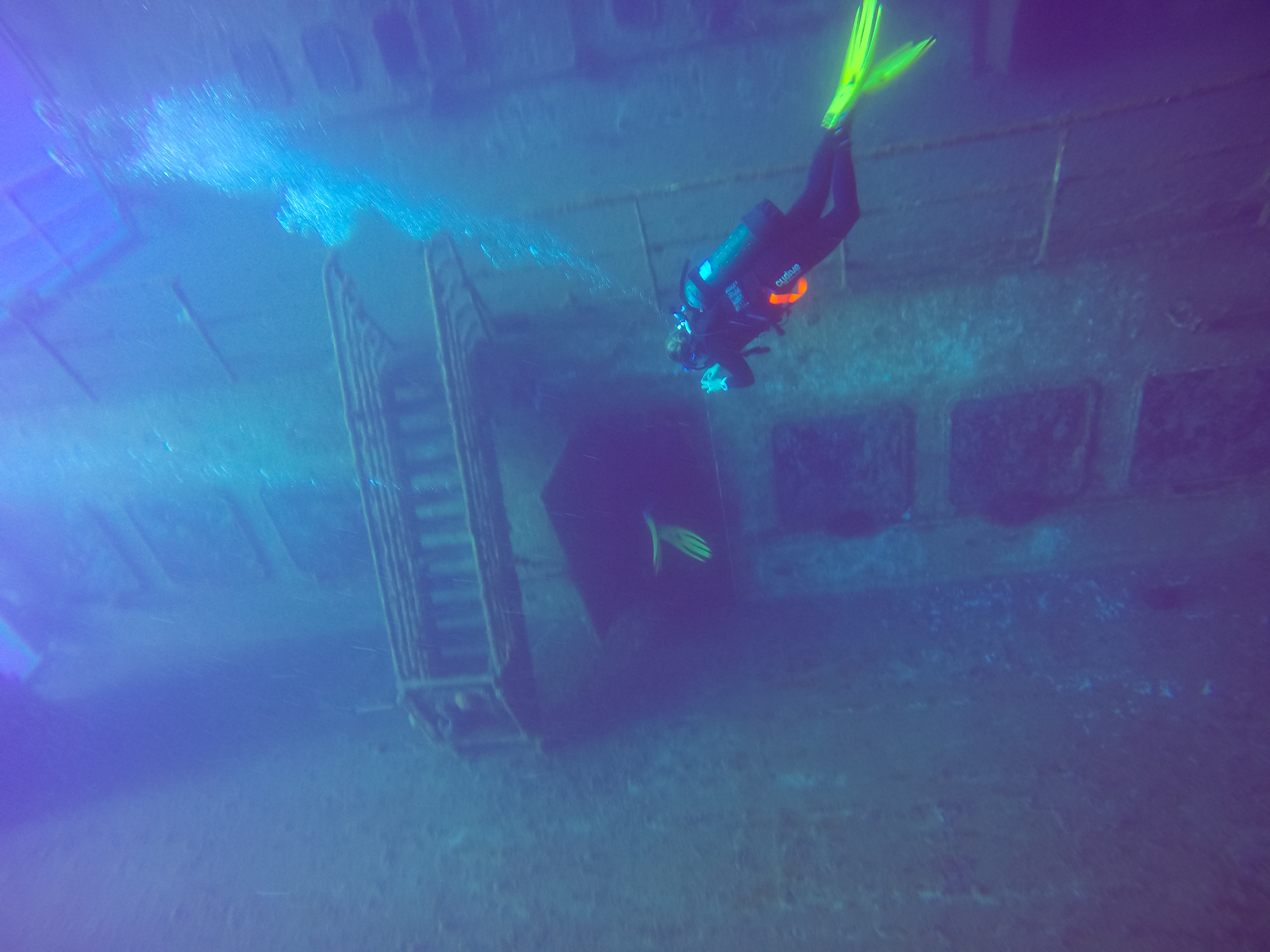
The wreck of MS Zenobia

- The Swedish passenger ferry MS Zenobia capsized and sank during its maiden voyage, five weeks after its departure from Malmö. The ferry, which carried trucks and their operators, was traveling from the city of Koper in Yugoslavia to the port of Latakia in Syria. After the ship was towed by the West German ship Ville Du Levant to the Larnaca harbor in Cyprus, all but 10 of the 147 people on board were safely evacuated on June 2. The ship was towed back out of the harbor and, five days after the original listing, the last 10 members of the crew who had remained aboard were evacuated. Minutes later, the ship sank along with its cargo of 122 loaded trailer trucks. The wreckage is now a popular site for divers.
- Immaculate Heart College, a Roman Catholic women's college with a campus in Hollywood, California, held its final graduation before closing its doors, and 350 students received their diplomas.
- Born: Henkka Seppälä, Finnish death metal bassist who performs as Henkka T. Blacksmith; in Espoo
- Died:
  - Richard Bonelli, 91, popular American opera baritone
  - Elizabeth Craig, 97, Scottish author of bestselling cookbooks from 1918 to 1980.
  - Henry Miller, 88, American novelist best known for Tropic of Cancer
  - Marian Spychalski, 73, head of state of Poland from 1968 to 1970

== June 8, 1980 (Sunday) ==
- All 19 people on a TAAG Linhas Aéreas de Angola airliner were killed when the three engine Yak-40K jet crashed. The plane went down about 17 minutes after taking off on a flight from Jamba to Lubango when it went down after being struck by artillery from "a foreign aircraft", possibly a Zambian Shenyang J-6 jet fighter.
- The Mandai massacre: The Bengalis of the village of Mandai, near Agartala in the Indian state of Tripura was carried out by tribal insurgents. According to official figures 255 Bengalis were massacred in Mandwi, while foreign presses, independent sources and eyewitnesses put the figure anywhere between 350 and 400.
- Elections were held in Hungary for the 352 seats of the Országgyűlés, the Hungarian parliament. Hungary's Communist organization, the Hungarian Socialist Workers' Party (MSzMP) won 252 of the 352 seats set aside for it, and the remaining 100 going to independents selected by the party. With 367 candidates, 15 of the races had a choice for voters.
- Died:
  - Majid Kalakani, 40, Afghan poet was executed.
  - Ernst Busch, 80, German singer and actor

== June 9, 1980 (Monday) ==
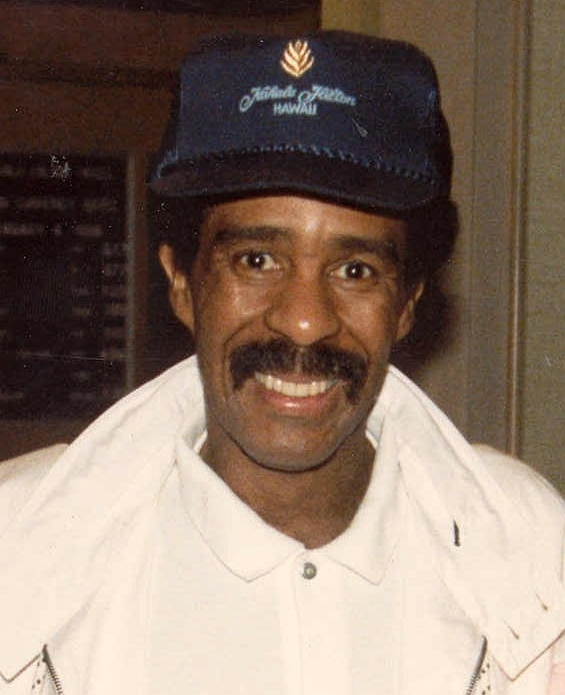
Pryor

- American comedian Richard Pryor was burned over half of his body after accidentally setting fire to himself at his home in Northridge, California. An emergency room physician at the Sherman Oaks Community Hospital said that Pryor had told him that the fire had been caused by an explosion while Pryor was freebasing cocaine in a crack pipe. Pryor's manager said that Pryor told him that he had accidentally set a glass of rum on fire while lighting a cigarette. After spending 45 days in the hospital, and overcoming an injury that doctors said was fatal in 2 out of 3 cases, Pryor was released on July 24.
- Independent Network News, an expansion of New York City's WPIX primetime newscast, premiered as a syndicated television evening news program for U.S. television stations that weren't affiliated with ABC, CBS or NBC. On January 12, 1987, it would re-brand itself as USA Tonight that would run for ten years until June 8, 1990.
- Died: Cvjetko Popović, 84, Bosnian Serb who was involved in the 1914 assassination of Archduke Franz Ferdinand of Austria.

== June 10, 1980 (Tuesday) ==
- The South African Defence Force (SADF) began its Operation Sceptic, an incursion from South-West Africa into Angola and attacked a base of the Namibian guerrillas of the People's Liberation Army of Namibia (PLAN) and the South-West Africa People's Organization (SWAPO). What had been thought to be a single base near Chitumba turned out to be "a complex of training camps spread out across 40 sq km" (15.5 square miles) of Angolan territory. In a three-hour battle, 76 PLAN guerrillas and 14 SADF troops were killed. Over the next 18 days, another 304 SWAPO guerrillas were killed with a loss of three SADF.
- Democratic U.S. Representative Charles H. Wilson from California was censured by the House of Representatives for "financial misconduct", as a result of the "Koreagate" scandal of 1976. "Koreagate" was an American political scandal involving South Koreans seeking influence with members of Congress.
- The African National Congress in South Africa published a statement, made by their imprisoned leader, Nelson Mandela, encouraging the continued fight against apartheid .
- United Airlines President Percy Wood was injured in Lake Forest, Illinois by an explosive package that would later be traced to "the Unabomber". A copy of one of Wilson's books, Ice Brothers, was used to conceal a bomb by terrorist Ted Kaczynski (the Unabomber). When Wood opened the book, a bomb concealed inside exploded, injuring him severely.
- Guatemala's Secret Anti-Communist Army (Ejército Secreto Anticomunistaor ESA ) attempted to assassinate an opposition leader, student Victor Manuel Valverth, on the campus of the University of San Carlos by two men who claimed to belong to the ESA. Valverth attempted to flee and was shot several times, but survived. One of the two men, Adam de Jesus Melgar, was murdered by students who came to Valverth's rescue.
- Born: Wang Yuegu, Chinese-born Singaporean table tennis player, gold medalist for the Singapore women's team

== June 11, 1980 (Wednesday) ==
- William George Bonin, later convicted of 14 murders perpetrated in southern California, was arrested in Hollywood. The arrest came days after a 41st victim of the suspected "Freeway Killer" was found dead on June 3. Bonin, a truck driver from Downey, California, had been seen driving a pale green van that had picked up a young man and was caught by police who followed the van to a parking lot. Convicted in 1982 of torturing and killing 10 of the victims, Bonin would be executed by lethal injection on February 23, 1996.
- French riot police and a 250-man contingent of the Royal Marines of Britain arrived at Port Vila at the request of the government of the New Hebrides, after the island of Tanna joined the island of Espiritu Santo in a rebellion. In Espiritu Santo, a group of rebels had declared an independent "Republic of Vemerana" in the course of the "Coconut War."
- Dr. Désiré Collen of Belgium filed for the U.S. patent for the first human protein manufactured using genetic recombination, with a process for creating an rtPA recombinant tissue plasminogen activator for dissolving blood clots. U.S. Patent No. 4,751,603 was granted on June 21, 1988 for "Plasminogen activator and pharmaceutical composition having thrombolytic activity".
- Libya's President Muammar Gaddafi announced in a speech that he was reversing previous decisions that had outraged his countrymen and the rest of the world. Gaddafi told Libyans at home that they would be allowed to keep their life's savings of Libyan dinar currency and that the old 5 dinar and 10 dinar notes would still be legal tender, reversing a May 15 order that had required them to be exchanged for new 5 and 10 dinar currency with a limit of 1,000 dinars allowed. Regarding money that had been lost to the banks, there was no refund, but Gaddafi pledged that the money would not be kept or invested until consultation had been made with the 167 "People's Congresses". Gaddafi also lifted his earlier order directing the killing of Libyans worldwide who had refused to return to Libya, with the exception of exiles who had been found guilty of collaboration with Israel, Egypt, or the U.S.
- Steve Ballmer joined the fledgling company Microsoft as its 30th employee in return for a salary of $50,000 per year and five percent ownership of the company, with stock options to purchase an additional 5%. At Microsoft incorporated on June 25, 1981, Ballmer would own eight percent and would later succeed Bill Gates as Chief Executive Officer on January 13, 2000. With the increase of his stock ownership, Ballmer now has a net worth of over 65 billion dollars.
- The United States signed a treaty with the Cook Islands specifying the maritime border between the Cook Islands and American Samoa and also relinquishing the U.S. claim to the islands of Pukapuka, Manihiki, and Rakahanga and the Penrhyn atoll.

== June 12, 1980 (Thursday) ==
- Universities in Iran were shut down as part of the Iranian Cultural Revolution, with all higher education systems ceasing for over a year for a complete overhaul, by order of the Supreme Council of the Cultural Revolution. The Ayatollah Khomeini declared that "All schools and universities established under the reign of the Shah must be placed in direct control in order to protect their students from the dangers of contamination by ideas contrary to the value of Islam."
- All 29 people were killed when Aeroflot Flight W-88, a Yak-40 jet airliner, struck the slope of a mountain during its approach to Dushanbe, the capital of the Tajikistan (at the time, the Tadzhik SSR of the Soviet Union). The flight had departed Khujand (at the time called Leninabad) and, because of a mistake in communications with the tower, descended to an altitude of 2,100 metres (6,900 ft) and impacted a 2,840 m (9,320 ft) mountain, 44 kilometres (27 mi) from the Dushanbe airport.
- Thirteen of the 15 people aboard Air Wisconsin Flight 965 were killed after the turboprop Swearingen Metro flew into a severe thunderstorm and "massive water ingestion" caused both engines to fail. The airliner had departed Appleton, Wisconsin earlier in the day on a two-stop flight to Grand Island, Nebraska and was 40 miles (64 km) from its landing at Lincoln when it crashed into a soybean field near Valley, Nebraska.
- Billy Wayne Clayton, the Speaker of the Texas House of Representatives, was indicted by a federal grand jury on fraud, conspiracy and racketeering charges after being videotaped accepting a $5,000 payment from an FBI informer to use his influence to obtain a state insurance contract for a phony company. Clayton became the first public official to be caught under the FBI's Operation Brilab.
- Born: Omar Maute, Philippine Moro terrorist and co-founder of Dawlah Islamiyah (killed 2017)
- Died:
  - Masayoshi Ōhira, 70, Prime Minister of Japan since 1978, died 12 days after being hospitalized for exhaustion during the national elections for all 511 seats in the Shūgiin, Japanese House of Representatives and for the Sangiin, Japan's 252 member House of Councillors. His chief cabinet secretary, Masayoshi Ito, became acting prime minister until the June 22 elections could be held.
  - Billy Butlin, 80, South African born British entrepreneur who built the Butlin's chain of holiday camp vacation resorts
  - Milburn Stone, 75, American television actor who portrayed "Doc" for 19 years on Gunsmoke

== June 13, 1980 (Friday) ==
- A jury in Chicago awarded MCI Communications $1,800,000,000 to be paid by AT&T for attempting to maintain its control over long-distance telephone calls, in violation of federal antitrust law. The jury found $600 million in damages and the amount was trebled under the antitrust law. After 15 of the 21 charges were reversed on appeal, the case was remanded for a new trial on the issue of calculation of damages. On May 28, 1985, another jury found $37.8 million in damages which was trebled to $113,400,000.
- U.S. Representative John W. Jenrette, Jr. (D-South Carolina) was indicted by a grand jury on charges of bribery after being identified in the FBI's Abscam operation. Jenrette had been videotaped on December 6, 1979, accepting a $50,000 bribe from an undercover agent in return for promising to introduce legislation to allow an Arab businessman to remain in the U.S. Eleven days later, Jenrette won a runoff election for the Democratic primary election for his seat.
- Viktor Nekipelov was sentenced to seven years in labor camps and five years' internal exile for "anti-Soviet agitation and propaganda" (Article 70); he was released in 1987 and moved to France, dying two years later.
- An Iranian student, in the United States on a visa, was arrested at a Kroger supermarket in Montgomery, West Virginia and charged with shoplifting, after the store manager witnessed Seyedashraf Mirhadi eat a single grape. The case took on national attention because Mirhadi, a student at the West Virginia University Institute of Technology was subject to deportation back to Iran if convicted of a "crime of moral turpitude". On July 24, a municipal court judge found Mirhadi not guilty. Judge Carl Harris wrote, "In some instances the partaking of a single fruit may constitute shoplifting— but this defendant I find as a factual matter to have lacked the elusive mental state which divides the criminal from the careless." Mirhadi's defense was that he was sampling the grape to see if the bunch was sweet or sour. In the hearing, the store manager testified that grapes were priced at $1.39 per pound, but conceded that he could not quantify the value of a single grape.
- Three motorcyclists were killed and six injured in separate incidents in the small town of Quenemo, Kansas, after 5,000 bikers were attracted to the Osage County town of 430 by advertisements in cycling magazines. By tradition, the town's lone tavern sold beer for 25 cents a cup and cyclists competed against each other in drag races in the town's business district. After windows were broken at City Hall, one person was shot and two others killed in collisions, Quenemo's two police officers relied on the aid of 60 law enforcement officers from the Osage County Sheriff's Department to disperse the crowd.
- Born:
  - Juan Carlos Navarro, Spanish pro basketball player and 2009 EuroLeague most valuable player; in Sant Feliu de Llobregat, Barcelona province
  - Sarah Connor (stage name for Sarah Lewe), German pop music singer; in Delmenhorst, Lower Saxony, West Germany
- Died:
  - Walter Rodney, 38, Guyana political activist, assassinated by a time bomb placed in his car
  - William A. Patterson, 80, American businessman who built United Airlines into the world's largest private passenger carrier, sometimes credited with introducing the position of flight attendant

== June 14, 1980 (Saturday) ==
- Yahya El Mashad, 48, Egyptian nuclear scientist and director of Iraq's nuclear program, was stabbed to death in his hotel room at Le Méridien Hotel in Paris. The Israeli intelligence group Mossad was suspected in the killing but no proof was found.
- Father Cosma Spessotto, 57, was shot and killed during Mass after speaking out against the regime in El Salvador. He became the ninth Roman Catholic priest to be killed in El Salvador since 1977.

== June 15, 1980 (Sunday) ==
- Goukouni Oueddei, the President of the north African nation of Chad, signed a "Treaty of Friendship and Alliance" with President Muammar Gaddafi of Libya, providing for the two nations to "defend each other if either party or both parties are exposed to direct or indirect foreign aggression".
- Former U.S. Attorney General Ramsey Clark and 10 other people returned from a two-week trip to Iran, in defiance of a presidential executive order banning U.S. citizens from traveling to the Islamic republic. Before leaving, Clark had been warned by incumbent Attorney General Benjamin Civiletti that he could be prosecuted for violating Carter's invocation of the travel ban, made under the International Emergency Economic Powers Act, which carried penalties of up to 10 years imprisonment and a $50,000 fine. During his visit, Clark attended the "Crimes of America" conference in Tehran at the invitation of Iranian Foreign Minister Sadegh Ghotbzadeh.
- Jack Nicklaus won the U.S. Open golf tournament.

== June 16, 1980 (Monday) ==
- The United States Supreme Court ruled in Diamond v. Chakrabarty, 5 to 4 that genetically modified organisms can be patented. Chemist Ananda Chakrabarty had developed a bacterium for cleanup of oil spills that could "eat crude oil more quickly and efficiently than natural bacteria" while he was employed at the General Electric Company in 1972.
- The East African nation of Mozambique closed its borders and barred entry to aircraft and ships in order to replace its currency, the escudo with the metical. For three days, Mozambican citizens were allowed to exchange their escudos for meticals, after which the Mozambican escudo would no longer be legal tender. President Samora Machel said that the changeover was necessary because a foreign power was attempting to flood the nation with forged escudo notes.
- Born:
  - Joey Yung (stage name for Yung Cho Yee), Hong Kong pop music singer and actress; ranked by the IFPI seven times as the best-selling female singer in Hong Kong between 2004 and 2014; in British Hong Kong
  - Brad Gushue, Canadian curling champion, 2006 Olympic gold medalist and 2017 world champion; in St. John's, Newfoundland
  - Jason Smith, American politician, Chairman of the House Ways and Means Committee since 2025 as U.S. representative for Missouri's 8th congressional district; in St Louis

== June 17, 1980 (Tuesday) ==
- After his research team ran out of water during an expedition in the Lop Nor desert, Chinese scientist Peng Jiamu left a brief note that said only "Gone east to find wells — Peng, 17/6 10:30." Peng had traveled into the Tarim Basin of China's Xinjiang province, and was never seen again. China's Radio Beijing news service later reported that "To save transportation costs for the state, Peng started out to find water by himself in 49 to 60 °C [120 to 140 °F] heat on June 17." The radio added that traces of Peng's whereabouts were found 9 kilometres (5.6 mi) from the campsite and that "It is concluded that Peng lost his way, then sat puzzling on the ground and was eventually buried by strong winds blowing sand." His disappearance remains a mystery.
- The Wall Street Final, an attempt by publisher Michael Goldstein to create an afternoon business newspaper in New York City to compete against The Wall Street Journal, published its first issue a day late, after breakdowns of production equipment caused the 16-page tabloid to miss its Monday afternoon launch date. Although the Final had the advantage of reporting the prices after the close of trading on the stock exchanges at 5:00, it would last for only two months before folding on August 18.
- Born: Venus Williams, American pro tennis star, five-time Wimbledon champion and twice U.S. Open winner, ranked number one by the Women's Tennis Association on three occasions; in Lynwood, California
- Died:
  - Walter H. Mallory, 87, Executive Director of the Council on Foreign Relations for 30 years
  - Andrey Shebalkov, 58, Hero of the Soviet Union for his 1945 defeat of German soldiers in the retaking of Hohensalza (now Inowroclaw) in Poland in 1945 during World War II. Later imprisoned and stripped of his medals for anti-Soviet writings, Shebalkov was restored to honor in 1957 after the death of Joseph Stalin.

== June 18, 1980 (Wednesday) ==
- By a margin of five votes, the proposed Equal Rights Amendment (ERA) to the U.S. Constitution failed in the Illinois House of Representatives. Although the vote was 102 in favor and 71 against, the rules of the Illinois legislature required a three-fifths majority of the 178 members on constitutional amendments. In the first five years of its submission to the 50 American state legislatures for consideration, 35 of the necessary 38 states had ratified the proposed 27th Amendment (although five states later vote to rescind their ratifications). After 1977, no other state ratified the ERA prior to the deadline of June 30, 1982.
- A federal grand jury in New York City indicted U.S. Representatives John M. Murphy of New York and Frank Thompson, Jr., of New Jersey for accepting $50,000 bribes offered to them in the course of the Abscam investigation by FBI agents.
- Shakuntala Devi demonstrated the multiplication of two 13-digit numbers—7,686,369,774,870 × 2,465,099,745,779—picked at random by the Computer Department of Imperial College London. She correctly answered 18,947,668,177,995,426,462,773,730 in 28 seconds, which included the time taken to give the answer.
- Born: Craig Mottram, Australian distance runner and gold medalist champion in 2005 in the 5000 meter; in Frankston, Victoria
- Died:
  - Terence Fisher, 76, British horror film director
  - Kazimierz Kuratowski, 84, Polish mathematician

== June 19, 1980 (Thursday) ==
- A bomb exploded at a political rally for Grenada's Prime Minister Maurice Bishop, shortly before he was scheduled to give an address. Although Bishop was unhurt, a woman and two children were killed, and 25 other people were wounded. Although the explosive had been placed directly beneath the floor of the pavilion where Bishop and the Cuban Ambassador to Grenada were sitting, its force spread sideways into the crowd, rather than directly above. Police killed the person suspected of planting the bomb, former Grenadan Army Sergeant John Phillips, in a shootout.
- Boswell Williams was appointed as the acting Governor-General of Saint Lucia and served for two and a half years before resigning.
- Born: Jason White, American college football player who won the Heisman Trophy as a quarterback in 2003, but was not drafted or given a tryout by an NFL team; in Tuttle, Oklahoma

== June 20, 1980 (Friday) ==
- In a bout for the WBC world welterweight boxing championship, billed as "The Brawl in Montreal", former WBC lightweight champion Roberto Durán of Panama upset previously unbeaten (27 wins, no losses) Sugar Ray Leonard at Montreal's Olympic Stadium to capture the welterweight division.
- The first parliamentary elections in Iraq since 1958 for the 250-member National Assembly. The Ba'ath Party won 187 of the 250 seats, and 14 of 19 women candidates won their races to become the first female members to serve as Iraqi legislators.
- The Zakat and Ushr Ordinances took effect in Pakistan, changing taxation over to Islamic principles and barring loans from all non-Muslim financial institutions as part of President Muhammad Zia-ul-Haq's program of "Islamization" of the south Asian nation. Under the rules, the zakat was collected for 2.5 percent of assets of greater than 1,000 rupees in savings accounts on the first day of the month of Ramadan, then redistributed to help people in poverty. The ushr, a 10% sales tax on goods imported from non-Muslim states, as well as 10% on harvests of irrigated farmland, and 5% on land dependent on well water.
- In Los Angeles, paleobiologist J. William Schopf announced that microscopic fossils found in Western Australia showed the oldest evidence of the first life on Earth, estimated to have become fossilized 3.5 billion years ago. The find was 400 million years earlier than the previous date for earliest life on earth, and had been made in the study of stromatolites, distinctive rocks that could only be formed by microorganisms. Dr. Schopf said that the fossils showed colonies of cells in threadlike filaments, and noted that single-celled bacteria must have existed much earlier, and spread over most of the earth by winds.

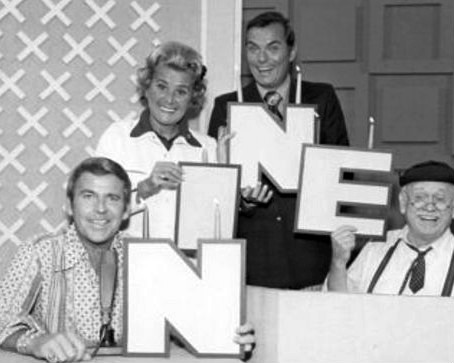
The Hollywood Squares

- The Hollywood Squares, a popular U.S. TV game show and celebrity comedy, broadcast its 3,536th and last daytime episode on NBC.
- The cult comedy The Blues Brothers and the romance The Blue Lagoon premiered on the same day, both to mixed reviews. Gene Siskel of the Chicago Tribune called The Blues Brothers "one of the all-time great comedies; the best movie ever made in Chicago" while Bruce Smith of New York's Daily News wrote that the film "is full of opportunities for comedy, few of them realized". Kevin Thomas of the Los Angeles Times wrote that The Blue Lagoon (a remake of a 1948 British film) "has triumphed on all counts" under the direction of Randal Kleiser while Kathleen Carroll of the Daily News said that the film "moves at a snail's pace, proving, once and for all, that life in tropical paradises can be painfully monotonous."

== June 21, 1980 (Saturday) ==
- In the Guatemalan Civil War, 60 plainclothes agents entered the Guatemala City headquarters of the Central Nacional de Trabajadores (CNT), Guatemala's trade union federation while uniformed National Police officers closed off the streets. The group arrested 27 of the union leaders, who had been planning the funeral of one of their members. The 27 men and women were taken away in Toyota jeeps and were not seen in public again.
- Died: Bert Kaempfert, 56, German composer and orchestra leader known for the music for Strangers in the Night, from a stroke

== June 22, 1980 (Sunday) ==
- In Japan's parliamentary elections, the Liberal Democratic Party won 284 of the 511 seats.
- In Kingston, security police arrested 26 officers and enlisted men of the Jamaica Defense Force who were charged with plotting to overthrow the government of Jamaica. Prime Minister Michael Manley, who had led the government of the Caribbean island nation since 1972, said in a radio broadcast that the roundup came "in connection with an alleged conspiracy to commit certain acts instrumental to national security and subversive of the constitutional government of Jamaica." Manley said in an address to the Jamaican parliament that the conspirators had planned to kidnap him and the JDF chief of staff, Brigadier General Robert Neish, and to force both to announce their resignations on the radio. On October 30, Manley would be voted out of office in favor of opposition leader Edward Seaga.
- West Germany's soccer football team beat Belgium, 2 to 1, to win the championship of the UEFA tournament before 47,860 people in Rome. Despite an injury early in the game, Horst Hrubesch scored the winning goal in the 88th minute of play with a header.
- Died:
  - Dimitrios Partsalidis, 79, Greek Communist who led the government of Communist-controlled areas of Greece during the Greek Civil War
  - Paul Hall, 65, American labor leader and anti-communist who had been President of the Seafarers International Union since 1957
  - Jesse Curry, 66, chief of the Dallas Police Department during the assassination of U.S. President John F. Kennedy.

== June 23, 1980 (Monday) ==
- A 75-day long heat wave began in the United States, as a high-pressure system stalled over Texas. The temperature in Dallas moved from a morning low of 75 °F and then rose to 104°. For 42 consecutive days, temperatures in Dallas and most of Texas reached "triple digits", rising above 100 °F (38 °C) every day for the rest of the month, and then through all 31 days of July, before abating on August 3. The hottest day of the heat wave was June 28, when the thermometer went no lower than 92 °F (33 °C) and then climbed to 112 °F (44 °C). Before it abated on September 6, the heat wave claimed 1,700 lives.
- A group of 200 Vietnamese soldiers invaded Thailand near Aranyaprathet to attack two Cambodian refugee camps. Seeking to extinguish further attacks by former Cambodian Khmer Rouge troops, the Vietnamese executed hundreds of civilians in the Nong Chan Refugee Camp and another camp at Mak Mun and forced others to flee back to Cambodia.

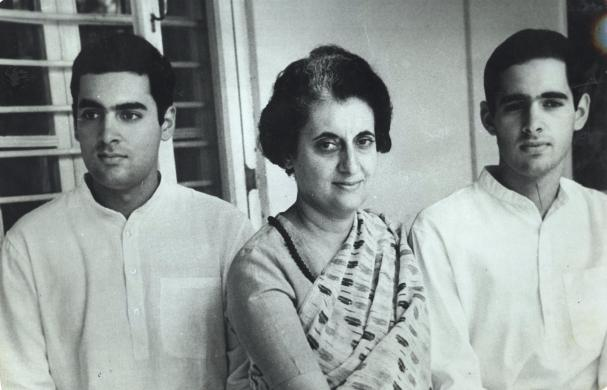
Rajiv, Indira and Sanjay Gandhi

- Sanjay Gandhi, the 33-year-old youngest son of India's Prime Minister Indira Gandhi and an upwardly-mobile politician, was killed in a plane crash. Sanjay, considered the likely successor of his mother, had taken off from New Delhi with his flight instructor, Subhash Saxena, in a Pitts Special SA-2 biplane and was reportedly performing aerial acrobatics, including loops, when the plane's engine stalled and the aircraft went into a spin and struck trees near Sanjay's home.
- Tim Berners-Lee began work on ENQUIRE, the computer system that would eventually lead to the 1990 inauguration of the World Wide Web.
- The David Letterman Show premiered on NBC as part of the U.S. network's daytime schedule.
- Raiders of the Lost Ark began principal photography at the Port de la Pallice in La Rochelle, France.
- Born:
  - Melissa Rauch, American comedian and TV actress known for The Big Bang Theory; in Marlboro Township, New Jersey
  - Erick Elías, Mexican TV actor and telenovela star; in Guadalajara
  - Manus Boonjumnong, Thai boxer and 2004 Olympic gold medalist; in Ratchaburi
  - Candice Reed, the first IVF baby in Australia and only the third in the world
- Died:
  - John Laurie, 83, British comedian and TV actor known for the sitcom Dad's Army
  - Clyfford Still, 75, American abstract expressionist painter

== June 24, 1980 (Tuesday) ==
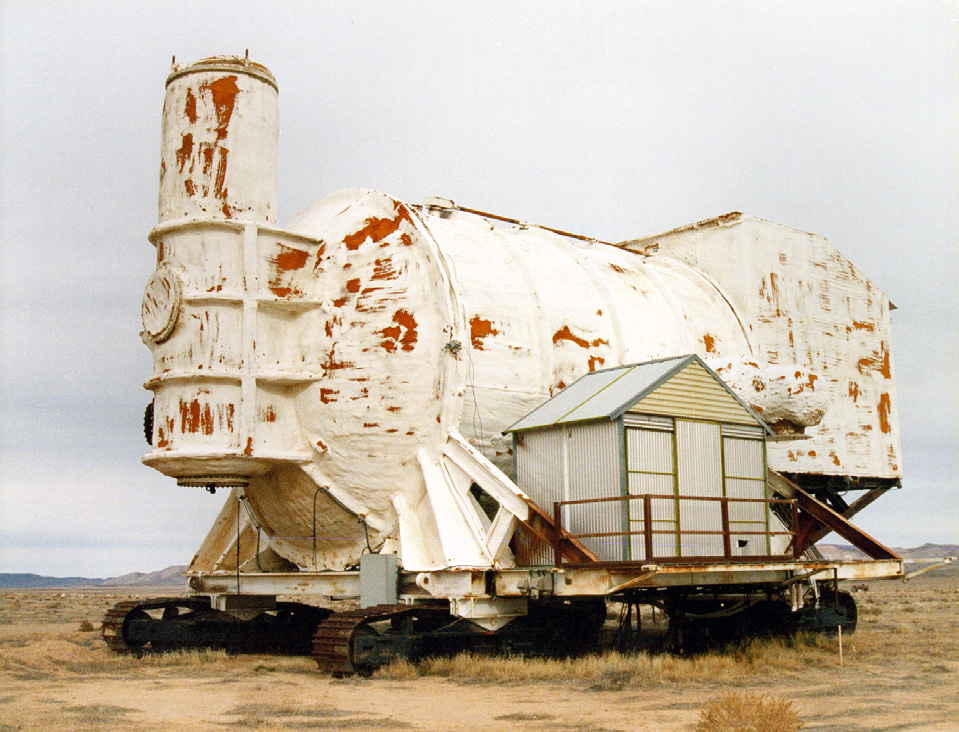
Huron King

- The Huron King experiment was carried out at the Nevada Test Site in the United States as "The first large-scale underground nuclear test of a realistic satellite test object" for purposes of improvement of the shielding of orbiting U.S. satellites from radiation produced by nuclear explosions As one author noted, "Satellites can be destroyed by the electrical effects induced by a burst of gamma rays from a nuclear explosion at a distance of hundreds of kilometers, because in space the intensity of the gamma rays... declines only as the inverse square of the distance." Since the U.S. had agreed to a ban on atmospheric and space testing of weapons, the experiment, which cost US$10.3 million, involved the placement of 20 kiloton nuclear device 1,050 feet (320 m) underground, over which a mobile test chamber on the surface carried a DSCS III defense communications satellite. "An instant after the detonation, the satellite was bathed in x-rays and gamma rays. Explosive-driven doors sealed the chamber a fraction after the detonation to prevent radioactive debris from reaching the satellite" after which the Huron King test chamber was driven away by remote control before a crater was formed by the explosion.
- Died:
  - Varahagiri Venkata Giri (V. V. Giri), 85, President of India from 1969 to 1974 and Governor of three different states of India
  - Boris Kaufman, 73, Russian-born American cinematographer, 1954 Academy Award winner for On the Waterfront
  - David Burpee, 87, American businessman who built a fortune in the selling of seeds.

== June 25, 1980 (Wednesday) ==
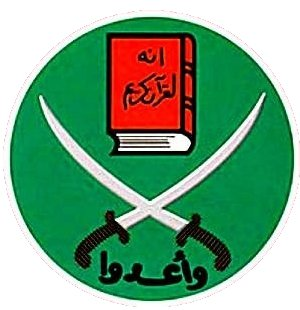
Muslim Brotherhood

- The Muslim Brotherhood failed in an assassination attempt against Syria's President Hafez al-Assad. The Syrian leader, who was hosting the visiting President of Niger, was slightly injured by a bomb explosion as he stepped out of his limousine. Assad retaliated by sending the Syrian Army on an unsuccessful mission to destroy the Muslim Brotherhood.

== June 26, 1980 (Thursday) ==
- France's President Valery Giscard d'Estaing announced that his nation had successfully developed its own neutron bomb, designed "to destroy living beings with short-lived radiation emissions, while avoiding major blast and heat effects".
- Born: Michael Vick, American NFL quarterback, in Newport News, Virginia
- Died: Ignatius Yacoub III, 67, leader of the Syriac Orthodox Church as Patriarch of Antioch and the Orient. On July 11, Archbishop Elias Zakka of Baghdad was elected as the new Patriarch

== June 27, 1980 (Friday) ==
- All 81 people on board Itavia Flight 870 were killed when the McDonnell Douglas DC-9 crashed into the Tyrrhenian Sea off the coast of Italy near the island of Ustica. Flight 870 had departed Bologna at 8:02 local time, bound for Palermo, but disappeared from the radar less than an hour after takeoff. In December, Italy's Transportation Minister Rino Formica and Itavia's president Aldo Zavanzali testified before an investigatory board that the airliner was probably shot down by a missile fired by a ship at sea.
- The Tadmor Prison massacre was carried out against prisoners in Palmyra who were members of the Muslim Brotherhood, after the failure of the assassination attempt against Hafez al-Assad. The killing was done on orders by the president's brother, Rifaat al-Assad. News of the massacre, which Syrian authorities said was done during an escape attempt, was reported by London's newspaper The Observer a month later on July 27.
- Draft registration was revived in the United States when President Jimmy Carter signed a bill requiring registration with the U.S. Selective Service System for all men born in 1960 and 1961, beginning on July 1.
- New York City Fire Department firefighters Larry Fitzpatrick and Gerry Frisby fell seven stories to their deaths while Fitzpatrick was attempting a rope rescue of Frisby, who had become trapped at a window during a tenement fire in Harlem. The accident led to upgraded standards for the quality and usage of fire department rescue ropes.
- Born:
  - Kevin Pietersen, South African-born English national team cricketer; in Pietermaritzburg
  - Dmitry Pirog, Russian professional boxer and WBO middleweight champion 2010 to 2012; in Temryuk, Russian SFSR, Soviet Union
- Died:
  - Barney Bigard, 74, American jazz clarinetist with the Duke Ellington Orchestra
  - Major General Walter Dornberger, 84, German missile scientist who led Nazi Germany's V-2 rocket program and oversaw the use of slave labor for the production of the rockets; after World War II, he avoided prosecution for war crimes by agreeing to work on the development of guided missiles for the United States.
  - Sue K. Hicks, 84, American jurist in Rhea County, Tennessee known for the "Scopes Monkey trial". He was one of the instigators of the 1925 Scopes Trial on the teaching of evolution and a co-prosecutor overshadowed by William Jennings Bryan, and persuaded his friend, teacher John T. Scopes, to start the cause of action. Hicks's unusual first name later inspired the song "A Boy Named Sue".
  - Carey McWilliams, 74, American investigative journalist and former editor of The Nation magazine

== June 28, 1980 (Saturday) ==
- John Marino, a 31-year-old gym teacher from Newport Beach, California, broke the record for bicycling across the United States, completing a 2,900 mi (4,700 km) trip from San Francisco to New York City in 12 days, 3 hours and 31 minutes— a day faster than the previous record, which he had set in 1978.
- The Olympic committees of 13 Western European nations announced jointly that, although they would participate in the 1980 Summer Olympics in Moscow, they would not participate in the opening or closing ceremonies and would use the International Olympic Committee flag rather than their own flags at medal ceremonies. Nations participating were Andorra, Belgium, France, Iceland, Ireland, Italy, Luxembourg, the Netherlands, Portugal, San Marino, Spain, Switzerland and the United Kingdom.
- Died:
  - José Iturbi, 84, Spanish concert pianist, harpsichordist and conductor
  - Helen Gahagan Douglas, 79, U.S. Representative for California from 1945 to 1951, remembered for the bitter 1950 election for U.S. Senator that she lost to then-California Congressman Richard M. Nixon

== June 29, 1980 (Sunday) ==
- Vigdís Finnbogadóttir narrowly defeated Guðlaugur Thorvaldsson by 1,911 votes in the 1980 Icelandic presidential election to become the first woman to be elected as a head of state in a democratic election, after winning the race to become President of Iceland. Women had previously been elected as prime ministers and other heads of government, but females had previously become heads of state by inheriting the office as monarchs, or by coups d'état or fraudulent elections. Finnbogadóttir, director of the Reykjavik Theatre, was sworn in to the largely ceremonial office on August 1.
- Elections were held in Bolivia for the President and for the 157 seats in the National Congress. None of the 13 presidential candidates (five of whom were former Bolivian presidents) received a majority, requiring the Bolivian Congress to vote for one of the top two finishers, Hernán Siles Zuazo and Víctor Paz Estenssoro. Second place finisher Paz announced on July 10 that he would drop out of the race, making the selection of Siles a certainty. Before the Congress could meet on August 6 for the vote, the Bolivian military staged a coup d'état on July 17.
- Forty-eight people were killed in the worst road accident in Romania's history. With 83 people on board, the overcrowded bus was on its way from Suceava to Botoșani when a blown tire occurred on a bridge near the village of Huțani. The bus then toppled off of the bridge and landed in a 5 m (16 ft) deep swamp. The disaster went unreported by Romania's state-controlled press.
- Born:
  - Martin Truex Jr., American race car driver, 2017 Monster Energy NASCAR Cup Series and twice NASCAR Busch Series champion; in Mayetta, New Jersey
  - James Courtney, Australian race car driver and 2010 V8 Supercars Championship winner; in Sydney
  - Katherine Jenkins, Welsh classical music singer; in Neath
- Died: Jorge Basadre, 77, Peruvian historian, former Minister of Education, and director of the Peruvian National Library

== June 30, 1980 (Monday) ==
- The U.S. Supreme Court decided United States v. Sioux Nation of Indians, by an 8–1 vote, affirming a decision of the U.S. Court of Claims and upholding compensation of $105,000,000 to the Sioux Nation in return for the U.S. seizure of seven million acres (11,000 square miles (28,000 km^{2})) of the Black Hills of South Dakota.
- The Energy Security Act was signed into law by U.S. President Carter, creating the independent Synthetic Fuels Corporation as a federal agency to fund the development of alternatives to imported oil.
- The Ibn Sina Trust was incorporated in Bangladesh with the objective "to serve humanity" by funding medial research and providing healthcare for Bangladesh's 89 million citizens.
- The British rock band Queen released its best-selling studio album The Game, which included "Another One Bites the Dust", "Play the Game", "Save Me", and "Crazy Little Thing Called Love".
- Born: Alireza Vahedi Nikbakht, Iranian soccer football winger and Iranian national team player, in Mashhad
