= Polovchak v. Meese =

- Court: United States Court of Appeals for the Seventh Circuit
- Full case name: Anna Polovchak and Michael Polovchak v. Edwin Meese III, et al
- Argued: September 9, 1985
- Decided: September 10, 1985
- Citation: 774 F.2d 731

Court membership
- Judges sitting: Richard Dickson Cudahy, Richard Posner, Luther Merritt Swygert

Case opinions
- Majority: Cudahy
- Concur/dissent: Swygert

Polovchak v. Meese, 774 F.2d 731 (7th Cir. 1985), was a federal court case involving a 12-year-old who did not want to leave the United States to return with his parents to the Ukrainian SSR.

Walter Polovchak was living in Chicago when his parents decided to return to Ukraine, then part of the USSR. He objected, running away from his parents to the home of a cousin and requesting asylum, which prompted the case. His parents returned to the Soviet Union with his two siblings.

The sympathetic Reagan administration allowed the legal proceedings to drag on for years, with the result that by the time a final decision was rendered, Polovchak had turned 18. No longer a minor, he was able to remain in the United States.

A court ruled that parents who are citizens of another country cannot remove their own child from the United States to their native land over the objection of their child unless the child is first afforded a hearing, to determine whether living in another nation is in the child's interests.

== See also ==
- Elián González — legal case involving a child who wanted to return to Cuba to live with his father.
