= Walter Polovchak =

Ukrainian-American man (born 1967)

Walter Polovchak (Ukrainian: Володимир Половчак, romanized: Volodymyr Polovchak; born 3 October 1967) is a Ukrainian-American man who, as a child, became the center of the legal case Polovchak v. Meese after he refused, at 12, to leave the United States to return to Ukraine, then part of the USSR, with his parents.

== Background ==
The Polovchak family consisted of parents Michael, a bus driver, and Anna, a confectionery factory employee, and their three children. They came to the United States from the city of Sambir, Soviet Ukraine in January 1980 on the invitation of Michael's sister, who had moved to the United States via Germany after World War II. The family settled in Chicago, where both parents found employment as cleaners, and Walter started attending a local school. Later that year, the parents decided to move back to the USSR, but Walter and his elder sister, Nataly, aged 17, disagreed. On July 13, 1980, both left their parents' Chicago home to stay with a cousin in the same city. The parents sought the assistance of the police to get their children back, but upon the advice of the US Immigration and Naturalization Service (INS) and of the US State Department, the police decided not to return the children to their parents but instead to start custody proceedings in an Illinois court.

== Asylum application ==
On July 19, 1980, Walter, with the help of his lawyer, filed an application for asylum with the INS, on the grounds of potentially being disadvantaged and persecuted in the USSR for being a defector. The application was granted, and in October 1981, he was able to adjust his legal status to that of a lawful permanent resident.

== Court case ==
The case became a Cold War cause célèbre after the INS allowed Polovchak to stay against his parents' will, even as they pursued legal means to retake custody of their son. While Walter and Nataly lived apart from their parents during the dispute, the sympathetic Reagan administration helped to drag out court proceedings until Walter turned 18 and was no longer a minor.

The case has similarities to that of Elián González. Soviet press covering the process claimed that Walter and his sister were being held by the United States as "hostages". During the process, which lasted almost 5 years, Polovchak had to live in several homes, mostly staying among Ukrainian Americans, and received money, food and clothes from his supporters. Polovchak's lawyers and witnesses, including a number of Soviet dissidents, claimed that in case of return to the USSR he would become subjected to political persecution, and issued an application for political asylum.

== Aftermath ==
In 1985 Walter received US citizenship. In 1993 he visited the now-independent Ukraine and re-established relations with his parents. Since then he has been travelling to the country every other year. He now lives in the Chicago suburb of Des Plaines, is married, and has two sons.

In March 2022, he spoke his opinions about the Russian invasion of Ukraine, saying “Russia is mercilessly killing Ukrainian children and families, destroying neighbourhoods, opera houses, churches and anything they can basically hit, It's very shocking but not surprising. The Russian government and Putin are thugs. They cannot be trusted, they consistently lie about everything - it's nothing but lies and propaganda." Walter also said that hearing about the war breaking out was “really disheartening” but that it wasn't surprising because “war criminal Putin has set in his mind that he wants to recreate the former Soviet Union."

== See also ==
- Elian Gonzalez affair – a 1999 Cuban child asylum case

== Sources ==
- Shipp ER. Soviet boy to be a "free man" today. New York Times, October 3, 1985, Section A, Page 18, Column 1.
