= Kay (surname) =

- Pronunciation: /ˈkeɪ/
- Language: English

Origin
- Languages: Old Breton, Welsh, Cornish; Old English
- Derivation: "cai", "key" (wharf) "coeg" (key)
- Meaning: "wharf" or "key"

Other names
- Variant form: Kaye

Kay is an English surname. It derives from the Old Breton and Welsh cai and the Cornish key meaning "wharf", or from the Old English coeg meaning "key". The surname is also a diminutive of MacKay and McKay. In England, the Kay(e)s of Lancashire and Yorkshire are believed to be related to the ancient Kaye family of Woodesham, Yorkshire, and there is also a Kay Family Association.

Notable people with this surname include:

- Adam Kay, British writer
- Alan Kay, American computer scientist and visionary
- Alec Kay (1879–1917), Scottish footballer
- Alex J. Kay, British historian
- Andrew Kay, American computer company CEO
- Anthony Kay, American baseball player
- Antony Kay, English footballer (see also Tony Kay below)
- Barnaby Kay, English actor
- Barry Kay, Australian scenery and costume designer; photographer
- Beatrice Kay, American actress
- Ben Kay, English rugby player
- Bernard Kay, British actor
- Billie Kay (born 1989), Australian professional wrestler
- Brian Kay, British singer and conductor
- Charles Kay, British actor
- Connie Kay, American jazz drummer
- Crystal Kay, J-pop singer
- David Kay, American scientist
- Dianne Kay, American actress
- Don Kay (composer), Tasmanian composer
- Dorothy Kay (1886–1964), Irish-born South African artist
- Doug Kay, football coach
- Elizabeth Kay, British writer
- Emma Kay, British artist
- George Frederick Kay (1873–1943), American geologist
- Guy Gavriel Kay, Canadian fantasy writer
- Hadley Kay, Canadian voice actor
- Iain Kay, Zimbabwean farmer and politician
- Jackie Kay, British poet and author
- James Ellsworth De Kay, American zoologist
- James Phillips Kay-Shuttleworth, British physician and politician
- Janet Kay, British singer of Jamaican descent
- Jason Kay, British singer Jay Kay of band Jamiroquai
- John Kay (disambiguation), multiple people
- John Walcott Kay, American physician
- Joseph Kay (disambiguation), multiple people
- June Kay, American civil rights activist
- Karen Kay (TV personality), British entertainer and mother of Jay Kay
- Kathie Kay, Scottish singer
- Katty Kay (born 1964), British journalist
- Kay Kay, Indian playback singer
- Lesli Kay, American actress
- Leslie Ronald Kay, British executive head of Universities Central Council on Admissions
- Lily E. Kay, historian of science
- Lisa Kay, actress
- Lori Kay, artist
- Manuela Kay, German writer and journalist
- Margaret Kay (c. 1904–1967), Aboriginal Australian museum owner and caretaker of sacred site
- Marshall Kay, American geologist
- Mary Kay (landscape photographer), Greek photographer
- Melody Kay, American actress
- Michael Kay (disambiguation), multiple people
- Michael Howard Kay, British software developer
- Neal Kay, British DJ
- Norman Kay (disambiguation), multiple people
- Paul Kay, American linguist
- Paula Kay, American politician
- Peter Kay, British comedian
- Peter Kay (rugby union)
- Peter Edmund Kay (1853–1909), horticulturalist
- Phil Kay, Scottish stand-up comedian
- Ray Kay, Norwegian film director
- Richard Kay (disambiguation), multiple people
- Robert Kay (disambiguation), multiple people
- Scott Kay, Jewelry Designer
- Sonny Kay, American record label owner
- Susan Kay, British writer
- Terry Kay, American writer
- Tom Kay (footballer, born 1883), English footballer
- Tom Kay (footballer, born 1892), English footballer
- Tony Kay, English footballer (see also Antony Kay above)
- Ughtred Kay-Shuttleworth, 1st Baron Shuttleworth
- Ulysses Kay, American composer
- Vernon Kay (born 1974), British television presenter
- Violet McNeish Kay (1914–1971), Scottish artist
- Wendell P. Kay (1913–1986), American attorney and politician
- William Kay (disambiguation), multiple people
- Willie Otey Kay, American dressmaker

== See also ==
- Kay (disambiguation)
- Kay-Shuttleworth
- Mary Kay, cosmetics brand
- Baron Shuttleworth
- Kaye (surname)
