= Kay (disambiguation) =

Kay is a given name.

Kay or KAY may also refer to:

== People ==
- Kay (surname), including a list of people with the name
- Kay (footballer)
- Kay (singer)
- Kay (vizier), an Ancient Egyptian official

== Places ==
- Kay, Iran
- Kay County, Oklahoma, United States
- Kay Island, Antarctica
- Kay Park, Scotland
- Kay Peak, Antarctica

== Transport ==
- Karaimadai railway station, Tamil Nadu, India, by Indian Railways station code

== Other uses ==
- Kamayurá language, Brazil, by ISO 639-3 code
- Kay Computers
- Kay Jewelers
- Kay Musical Instrument Company
- Kay, an album by John Wesley Ryles
  - "Kay" (song), its title track
- 'kay, short for okay, a term of approval or assent
- An epithet for a ruler of the mythological Kayanian dynasty
- The pronunciation of the letter K

== See also ==
- K, the eleventh letter in the Latin alphabet
- Kaylee
- Kai (disambiguation)
- Khay (disambiguation)
- Kaye (disambiguation)
- Kaya (disambiguation)
