= New Year's Eve Live =

American TV series

- Presented by: Anderson Cooper; Kathy Griffin; Andy Cohen
- Country of origin: United States

Production
- Running time: 305 minutes

Original release
- Network: CNN
- Release: December 31, 2001 – present

New Year's Eve Live with Anderson Cooper and Andy Cohen is an annual New Year's Eve television special broadcast by CNN and CNN International. It primarily focuses on coverage of the "ball drop" event held at New York City's Times Square, while also featuring coverage of festivities in other areas of the U.S. and around the world.

Anderson Cooper has been hosting New Year's Eve Live since 2002. From 2007 to 2017, comedian Kathy Griffin was Cooper's co-host, providing bawdy comic relief; Griffin was dismissed from the program and CNN in May 2017, and replaced by Andy Cohen beginning with the 2017–18 edition. The program has become known for its sometimes raucous and controversial moments.

== Overview ==
On December 31, 2001, Miles O'Brien hosted informal, news-based coverage of New Year's Eve celebrations in Times Square. CNN correspondents provided reports of the festivities from the crowd, including the swearing in of incoming New York City mayor, Michael Bloomberg.

In 2002, Anderson Cooper took over as host from Times Square. He had volunteered to host New Year's coverage in response to his own personal ambivalence on the holiday. In addition to Times Square, the program has frequently broadcast from Nashville, Memphis, New Orleans, and Key West, where Gary Marion (a drag queen who performs as "Sushi") rides a ruby shoe down to ring in the new year. On May 31, 2017, CNN cut its ties with Griffin after she had posted a photo depicting her holding a mock severed head of U.S. president Donald Trump. A CNN spokesperson described her photo as "disgusting and offensive", while Cooper himself condemned the photo by stating that it was "clearly disgusting and completely inappropriate". On October 11, 2017, Andy Cohen was announced as Griffin's replacement.

Guest correspondents over the years included Don Lemon, Poppy Harlow, Ed Henry, John Zarrella, and Gary Tuchman—who was usually assigned to smaller and more eccentric New Year's celebrations. In recent years, musical performances inside Times Square and in other places have been shown.

The program was initially only 30 minutes long, beginning at 11:30 p.m. ET until shortly after the conclusion of the ball drop. The runtime was expanded to 90 minutes beginning in 2003, and was extended several times in the following years. As of 2022, the program ran from 8 p.m. until just after 1 a.m. ET, with the last half hour focusing on festivities in the Central Time Zone (most often New Orleans and/or Nashville). This was in contrast with other nationally broadcast New Year's Eve programs until 2017, when ABC's New Year's Rockin' Eve started broadcasting a Central Time countdown from New Orleans.

Beginning in 2023, the special added coverage of celebrations from the Mountain Time Zone (extending its runtime to just after 2 a.m. ET), which until 2026 was anchored by Tuchman (who left the network in 2025) and his daughter Lindsay. The Pacific Time Zone does not receive live coverage during the special, with a tape-delayed encore of the late-night portion of the special (beginning from the 11:00 p.m. ET hour in Times Square) shown at this time.

== Past editions ==
=== 2003–2006 ===
On December 31, 2003, Anderson Cooper hosted, joined by Jason Carroll (street reports), Hugh Hefner (at the Playboy Mansion), Cyndi Lauper, Wyclef Jean, Ben Stein, Amazing Kreskin, The Flaming Lips, John Zarrella (Key West), Kendis Gibson (Elma, New York, where a resident had won a write-in contest to have the show come to her New Year party, which in her case also was a graduation and going-away party for her son), and live look-ins at celebrations in other cities.

On December 31, 2004, New Year's Live with Anderson Cooper featured a performance by Celine Dion from Caesars Palace in Las Vegas.

On December 31, 2005, Anderson Cooper hosted from Times Square, with Erica Hill reporting from the crowd on the street. John Zarrella reported from Key West, Betty Nguyen was in Chicago, and Susan Roesgen was in New Orleans, which was recovering from Hurricane Katrina. Musical performances included James Brown at B.B. King's blues club in Times Square, John Mayer Trio in San Francisco, Barenaked Ladies at St. Pete Times Forum, Brooks & Dunn in Nashville, Fantasia at The Aladdin in Las Vegas, Kool & the Gang, and Wynton Marsalis. Harry Connick, Jr. did a special feature on New Orleans, while Chef Paul Prudhomme joined for a cooking segment also in New Orleans.

On December 31, 2006, New Year's Live with Anderson Cooper featured a performance by the Goo Goo Dolls in Anaheim, California, and Montgomery Gentry at Rupp Arena. James Brown was scheduled to perform a song live, but he died on December 25.

=== 2007–08 ===
For the program on December 31, 2007, comedian Kathy Griffin joined Anderson Cooper as co-host for the 90-minute show. The two immediately developed a unique rapport, which featured discussion about pop culture events and off-beat news stories from the year. Griffin actively engaged Cooper in various personal questions and rumors, and often steered the program off-track from Cooper's normal strait-laced broadcasting style. Griffin also initiated an annual drinking game for each time she addressed Cooper as "Andy."

Erica Hill reported from street level in the crowd in Time Square, Kiran Chetry reported from Hard Rock Cafe, Gary Tuchman took part in the "Midnight Run" in Central Park, and John Zarrella reported from Key West. Sean Callebs (New Orleans) and Kareen Wynter (Las Vegas) also joined for segments.

=== 2008–09 ===
For the program on December 31, 2008, comedian Kathy Griffin joined Anderson Cooper as co-host for the second year, this year expanded to two hours. Griffin spent much of the night responding to hecklers. As the show was going to commercial she responded to a heckler by saying "I don't go to your job and knock the dicks out of your mouth." She also asked if she could "get a pap smear from Dr. Sanjay Gupta," to which Cooper responded "Really, are we going there already?" She later called Glenn Beck a "heroin addict Mormon." She asked Cooper if he had ever "ridden the Morning Express" (a reference to Robin Meade whom Griffin claimed Cooper was "in love with").

Don Lemon and Erica Hill reported from street level and Gary Tuchman from the Midnight Run in Central Park. Brooke Anderson reported from Las Vegas, Sean Callebs reported from New Orleans, and John Zarrella reported from Key West. White House Correspondent Ed Henry reported from Hawaii, following president-elect Obama on vacation.

=== 2009–10 ===
During the December 31, 2009, episode, Kathy Griffin drew controversy after saying "fuck" live on the air. During a segment where Cooper and Griffin were recounting pop culture events of the year, the subject of the Balloon Boy was brought up. During an exchange, Griffin said "Wait … Falcon? Fuckin'? Falcon? How do you say it?" Cooper quickly responded "You're terrible," and quickly switched to a new topic. Griffin then joked about having 'a lesbian three-way with Susan Boyle and Oprah,' and said she was engaged to Levi Johnston. She also asked Cooper "how do you not just stare in the mirror all day and pleasure yourself because you're so gorgeous?"

In the days immediately following, it was reported that Griffin was fired from the position and would not be invited back.

Lance Bass joined the show as a correspondent at Planet Hollywood in Las Vegas. Don Lemon and Poppy Harlow served as street reporters, interviewing patrons in Times Square. John Zarrella reported live from Key West, and Gary Tuchman from Central Park.

=== 2010–11 ===
Despite rumors that Kathy Griffin had been banned from CNN, she returned for her fourth year on December 31, 2010. The 90-minute program featured Cooper and Griffin hosted in Times Square, with Brooke Baldwin reporting live in Nashville, John Zarrella in Key West and Gary Tuchman again participating in the "Midnight Run" in Central Park. Isha Sesay reported from the crowd in Times Square.

Among the random discussions were Griffin's visit with Cher, and a live phone call from Cooper's mother Gloria Vanderbilt. Griffin maintained her typical antics, at one point kissing a crew member, and pretended to start undressing Cooper. However, she completed the broadcast without saying any swear words.

=== 2011–12 ===
On December 31, 2011, Cooper and Griffin hosted for the fifth year. CNN correspondents included: Isha Sesay (street reports), Gary Tuchman and his 14-year-old daughter (Central Park run), John Zarrella (Key West), Brooke Baldwin and Marty Savidge (Nashville).

Anderson Cooper took part in a pre-recorded skit involving the Spider-Man Broadway show. Immediately thereafter, Griffin ridiculed it as being lame and unfunny. The program featured phone calls from Kelly Ripa and David Gergen. Kathy Griffin's antics reached a point at 11:48 p.m. where she took her coat and shirt off and appeared on-air wearing only a bra. During the telecast, Cooper joked with her with a sign from the crew stating "No Nudity" and "No Swearing," based on her previous appearances. Griffin also said to Anderson "I'm [going to] watch your balls drop," a double entendre of the popular phrase "watch the ball drop." She poked fun at ChristianMingle.com (an online dating service), kissed Cooper on the lips (which apparently left him uncomfortable), and claimed that Mayor Michael Bloomberg "fondled" Lady Gaga on the ball drop podium after they kissed.

=== 2012–13 ===
On December 31, 2012, Cooper and Griffin returned for their sixth year together. The program aired from 10:00 PM EST to 1:00 AM. Correspondents joining the broadcast included Isha Sesay (Times Square), John Zarrella (Key West), Gary Tuchman (Eastport, Maine), Brooke Baldwin (New Orleans) and Susan Hendricks (Nashville). Griffin's usual antics continued as at one point she dropped to her knees near Cooper's crotch, and also asked him "do you have a sac?" Cooper replied, "I don't know what you're talking about, I have no sack of Christmas presents here."

The three-hour broadcast featured a live interview via satellite with Honey Boo Boo, and a visit on the podium by Psy and MC Hammer.

=== 2013–14 ===
For the 2013–2014 broadcast, Cooper and Griffin hosted their seventh consecutive year together. The program aired live from 9 p.m. through 12:30 a.m. EST. It was the first year the program began at 9 p.m. EST.

Anderson and Kathy were joined on set by guests: Macklemore and Ryan Lewis, Melissa Etheridge among others. This was John Zarella's final year with CNN, where he has featured the Drag Queen Drop in Key West, Florida for a number of years. The cast looked back at Zarella's remarkable career with the network. Tuchman reported from the Watermelon Drop in Vincennes, Indiana.

Cooper and Griffin carried the show for three and a half hours, then similar to years past, tossed to Brooke Baldwin in New Orleans at 12:30 a.m. for a 35-minute coverage of the New Year in the Central Time Zone. Baldwin along with Susan Hendricks shared a live music performance with Hank Williams Jr.

In 2013, the hashtag associated with the program #CNNNYE trended on Twitter from 9 p.m. EST through midnight.

=== 2014–15 ===
Cooper and Griffin co-hosted New Year's Eve live on December 31, 2014, live from New York's Times Square. The program aired from 9:00 p.m. to 1:00 a.m. eastern, the longest running time ever for the duo. Don Lemon and Brooke Baldwin hosted from 12:30–1:05 a.m. eastern, ringing in the Central Time Zone's New Year from New Orleans. Griffin's antics were tame compared to previous years, as her only trick of the night was to put red and blue dye in Cooper's gray hair.

Richard Quest was scheduled to report live from the Quantum of the Seas cruise ship off the coast of The Bahamas; although he was called back to New York to cover the AirAsia Flight 8501 crash. Quest instead reported from street level in Times Square. In his place on the cruise ship was CNN correspondent Randi Kaye. Gary Tuchman was scheduled to report live from the 'Crab Drop' in Easton, Maryland, but he was sent to Indonesia on assignment for the AirAsia crash. His daughter, Lindsay Tuchman, a reporter for CNN affiliate WBOC (located in Salisbury, Maryland which is near Easton) reported in his place.

Michaela Pereira joined Quest as reporter on the street in Times Square. This was the first time in four years that Isha Sesay did not partake in the coverage. Patrick Oppman reported from Havana, and Pamela Brown reported from Memphis. Though no reporters were present, footage was shown from Key West.

=== 2015–16 ===
Cooper and Griffin were back for their ninth year on December 31, 2015. The duo hosted an extra hour, beginning at 8 p.m. eastern time, starting the broadcast from their "NYE war room", a hotel suite at the New York Marriott Marquis. Poppy Harlow contributed from Times Square, instead of Rio de Janeiro, following her on-air faint scare. Richard Quest assumed her position in Brazil. Randi Kaye reported from Memphis, where cameras caught the celebration as the city's "Guitar Drop" was briefly stalled due to a guest placing their hand through the track for the 10 foot guitar to be lowered. Gary Tuchman and his daughter Lindsay Tuchman reported from Hershey, Pennsylvania from the "Hershey's Kiss Raise." Don Lemon and Brooke Baldwin shared festivities from New Orleans.

At 8:47 p.m., as Cooper and Griffin were walking down to street level in Times Square, Griffin removed her coat and for part of the evening, appeared on-screen wearing only a bra. Don Lemon subsequently commented "I have to say: nice rack." Guests on stage included Jessie J ("Bang Bang") and Gus Kenworthy. In addition, Dana Bash appeared with Griffin in a pre-recorded skit. The night was filled with memories from the year, clips from their previous New Year's Eve broadcasts, and a video of Griffin doing the Ice Bucket Challenge nude. Griffin spray tanned Anderson's face.

=== 2016–17 ===
Cooper and Griffin returned for their tenth year on December 31, 2016. The program aired from 8 p.m. to 12:30 a.m. Eastern time. Reporters included Richard Quest (Times Square); Don Lemon and Brooke Baldwin (New Orleans); Nischelle Turner (Nashville); Gary Tuchman and Lindsay Tuchman (Miami); Randi Kaye (cruise ship) and Lynn Smith (Dallas). Lemon and Baldwin took over as hosts at 12:30 a.m. to cover the central time zone countdown. Keith Urban performed.

Cooper and Griffin received well-wishes from numerous celebrities, including Sharon Stone, Dave Grohl, Josh Groban, Kristin Chenoweth, and Ron Jeremy. Megan Mullally and Nick Offerman sent a video clip in which both appeared to be naked, inviting the duo to "join us in our bed...for some sex." Griffin wrapped Cooper in aluminium foil to celebrate their tenth anniversary together (tin/aluminum foil is the "traditional" 10th anniversary gift). With Griffin's typical antics muted, the critical attention for the night focused on Don Lemon, who during his on-air segments was drunk, and at one point during the evening, had one of his ears pieced on live television.

CNN International's simulcast of the event was significantly cut back to give way to breaking news coverage of the Istanbul nightclub shooting, with Cyril Vanier anchoring from the CNN Center in Atlanta. CNNI joined New Year's Eve Live at 11:00 PM ET.

=== 2017–18: Firing of Griffin and replacement with Andy Cohen ===
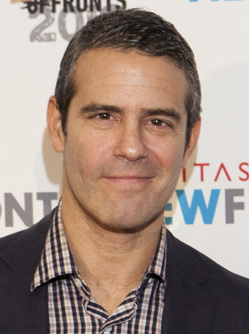
Andy Cohen joined New Year's Eve Live as its new co-host in 2017.

In May 2017, Griffin was fired from the program and CNN after she had released a controversial publicity photo which depicted her with an effigy of the severed head of U.S. president Donald Trump. In October 2017, Andy Cohen, who had previously co-hosted NBC's New Year's Eve with Carson Daly for 2016, and has collaborated with Cooper on a storytelling tour, was named as Cooper's new co-host.

The broadcast featured a series of field segments by Randi Kaye on a New Year's Eve "pot bus" tour in Denver, Colorado. The tour included stops at a grow house and a "paint and puff" party, while Kaye was seen helping light a reveler's gas mask bong after briefly explaining the item, and passing a joint along to other revelers. Cooper discussed the segments in an appearance on The Late Show with Stephen Colbert afterward, telling host Stephen Colbert that "the whole thing surprised me as much as anybody else", but pointed out that the activities seen were legal in Colorado, and noted that Kaye did not actually smoke any cannabis (although Colbert suggested that she may have had second hand exposure, and jokingly asked Cooper if he got "a contact high from Randi Kaye").

=== 2018–19 ===
Andy Cohen returned for a second year to host with Anderson Cooper. Guests included Patti LaBelle, Gwen Stefani, Keith Urban, Dave Chappelle, Dead & Company, and Jack Black. During the show, the Times Square Alliance (the business improvement district for the area) asked Cohen to take down his umbrella so that it wouldn't obstruct the shots of other media outlets sharing the riser space. Cohen complained on-air that they had been targeted, pointed out other outlets were able to keep their umbrellas up, and stated that the Alliance threatened to pull CNN's credentials for the following year.

=== 2019–20 ===
Cohen and Cooper once again hosted from Times Square, with Randi Kaye reporting from Key West, and Baldwin and Lemon reporting from Nashville. Cheri Oteri made a guest appearance, reprising her Barbara Walters impersonation from Saturday Night Live, as a nod to one of Walters' introduction to the newsmagazine 20/20 (the real Walters had not appeared in public since 2016.)

=== 2020–21 ===
Cohen and Cooper hosted from a sparsely populated, socially-distanced Times Square, with Baldwin and Lemon hosting for other time zones from Lemon's house (an "undisclosed location.") Cheri Oteri reprised her guest appearance as "Barbara Walters", Bill Weir got a tattoo on the air, Gary Tuchman and Lindsay Tuchman appeared from a ski slope, Richard Quest reported from Times Square, Randi Kaye reported from a Florida dog shelter, and Ana Cabrera reported from a socially distanced dance party atop 30 Hudson Yards, where CNN maintains its New York studios. Guests and performers included Kylie Minogue, Snoop Dogg, John Mayer, Gloria Gaynor, Josh Groban, Leslie Jordan, Patti LaBelle, Jimmy Buffett, and Desus & Mero. After midnight, Cohen criticized then mayor Bill de Blasio, telling him to "Do something with this city".

=== 2021–22 ===
Crowds returned to Times Square, as did Cohen and Cooper. Lemon was joined in New Orleans at a parade with Alisyn Camerota (Baldwin had departed the network earlier that year), and comedian Dulcé Sloan. Other correspondents included Stephanie Elam in Las Vegas, Randi Kaye in Key West, Richard Quest performing the CityClimb atop 30 Hudson Yards, Chloe Melas from Times Square, Donie O’Sullivan at Hudson Hound, an Irish bar in the West Village, and Gary and Lindsay Tuchman in San Juan, Puerto Rico for the city's 500th anniversary. Cheri Oteri reprised her role as Barbara Walters. Other guests included Patti LaBelle, Amanda Gorman, Katy Perry (from her Play residency at Resorts World Las Vegas), William Shatner, Leslie Jordan, and Earth, Wind & Fire. Shortly after midnight, Cohen re-iterated his disdain for outgoing mayor Bill de Blasio, and celebrated the inauguration of Eric Adams. Cohen had also criticized Ryan Seacrest, host of New Year's Rockin' Eve (arguing that people who watched the special instead of New Year's Eve Live were "watching nothing"), for which he later apologized.

During central time coverage, Lemon responded to attacks he faces, saying in part "You can kiss my behind, I do not care. I don’t care. Sloan also attracted attention for stating that there will be "no more broke dick," referring to a man without money.

=== 2022–23 ===
During an internal town hall in November 2022, the new head of CNN, Chris Licht announced that Cooper and Cohen are planned to host once again. He also stated that on-air personnel would no longer be allowed to drink during the program, but the co-hosts were to be exempt from this new edict. In response to this, Cohen promised to "party harder than ever before." Cooper and Cohen elected to not drink during the telecast, setting up a recurring segment featuring the co-hosts taking "mystery shots" of non-alcoholic drinks throughout the night and trying to guess what they were, including pickle juice, buttermilk, and apple cider vinegar.

On location in New Orleans, Don Lemon missed midnight in the Central Time Zone; the telecast at that point showed a split screen of scenes from the party and of Nashville's music note drop, with no commentary. For the first time, CNN also broadcast live coverage from a celebration in the Mountain Time Zone (2:00 a.m. ET), with Gary and Lindsay Tuchman covering Boise's Idaho Potato drop.

For this year's edition, CNN International's own non-stop coverage of the global celebrations were formally integrated for the first time under the New Year's Eve Live banner from 8:00 AM Eastern (9:00 PM Hong Kong/Manila) as a lead in to the simulcast of Cooper and Cohen from Times Square. Kristie Lu Stout and Isa Soares anchored from Hong Kong and London respectively

=== 2023–24 ===
The special featured guest appearances by Bridget Everett, Eva Longoria, John Mayer (who appeared from a cat café in Tokyo, much to Cooper's amusement), Jeremy Renner, Henry Winkler, and Bowen Yang. Cooper and Cohen returned to drinking alcohol during the telecast, taking a tequila shot at the top of each hour. Cohen continued his apparent feud with Ryan Seacrest, while the co-hosts revealed to Cohen's parents that they've never needed to go to the bathroom during the special (albeit noting that there was a portable toilet available nearby). The Mountain Time coverage originated from Las Cruces, New Mexico's chili pepper drop.

=== 2024–25 ===
The 2024–25 edition featured performances by 50 Cent (from Planet Hollywood Las Vegas), Diplo (from Avalon Hollywood), Lil Jon, Meghan Trainor, Patti LaBelle, Shania Twain, and Sting. Sara Sidner, Harry Enten, and Cari Champion hosted Central Time coverage from Auditorium Shores in Austin, and Gary Tuchman hosted Mountain Time coverage from Prescott, Arizona's boot drop.

During an interview, Cohen dubbed actor Jon Hamm the "male Nicole Kidman" due to his workload, to which Hamm agreed. After being asked by Cohen about the most "conventional" place he had ever done LSD, Diplo revealed that he had microdosed the hallucinogen while on a helicopter ride to the Avalon Hollywood before going on-air.

=== 2025–26 ===
The 2025–26 edition featured performances by Robyn from Times Square, Bryan Adams from Madison Square Garden, Shakira from Hard Rock Live in Hollywood, Florida, Vince Gill from Austin, Aloe Blacc, Brandy and Monica, Florence and the Machine, Patti LaBelle, and Raye among others, and appearances by Stephen Colbert, B. J. Novak, Jerry O’Connell, Oz Pearlman, and Amy Sedaris among others. The broadcast featured puppets resembling the hosts (Lil' AC and Andy), designed by New York based Furry Puppet Studio. Sara Sidner and Cari Champion hosted Central Time coverage from Auditorium Shores in Austin. For the first time, CNN's U.S. feed also carried CNN International's day-long New Year's Eve coverage focusing on global celebrations, leading into Cooper and Cohen's telecast.

Stephen Colbert made a guest appearance, playing "Never have I ever" with Cooper and Cohen (with Colbert admitting that he had sometimes forgotten about his guests' past appearances on his own shows), and saying of CBS's decision to cancel The Late Show: "What did I learn this past year? Don’t trust billionaires. They don't get rich by finding that money on the side of the road, brother."

In May 2026, CNN announced that Cooper and Cohen would host a spin-off special on July 3, Independence Eve Live with Anderson & Andy, as part of CNN's wider Fourth in America: Celebrating 250 programming covering the United States semiquincentennial. The special was broadcast from Times Square, covering an America250-sponsored lowering of the ball for midnight ET on July 4; Cohen suggested that they'd be drinking beer "all night long", citing that it was "the most American drink there is".

== Ratings ==
The episode from December 31, 2008, rated as the top New Year's Eve program on cable. However, for 2009–2011, the program fell to second behind Fox News Channel's All-American New Year. In 2011, CNN slightly edged FNC in the key demographics. In 2013, the show saw a 40% drop in its audience.

In 2015, the program was the No. 1 cable news program in total viewers in the half-hour leading up to midnight.

Year	Block	Timeslot	Viewers (millions)	18–49 rating	Ref(s)
2005	Full program	11:00 pm–12:30 am	0.93	—N/a	
2006	Full program	11:00 pm–12:30 am	1.14	—N/a	
2007	Full program	11:00 pm–12:30 am	1.13	—N/a	
2008	Full program	11:00 pm–12:30 am	2.45	—N/a	
2008	Full program	11:00 pm–1:00 am	2.31	—N/a	
2009	Full program	11:00 pm–12:30 am	1.96	—N/a	
2009	Late night	11:00 pm–12:00 am	1.67	—N/a	
2010	Full program	11:00 pm–12:30 am	1.81	—N/a	
2010	Late night	11:00 pm–12:00 am	1.53	—N/a	
2011	Late night	11:00 pm–12:00 am	1.61	—N/a	
2011	Late night	11:00 pm–12:30 am	1.89	—N/a	
2011	Late night	12:00 am–1:00 am	1.87	—N/a	
2012	Prime time	10:00 pm–11:00 pm	1.39	—N/a	
2012	Late night	11:00 pm–12:00 am	2.11	—N/a	
2012	Late night	11:00 pm–12:30 am	2.35	—N/a	
2013	Late night	11:00 pm–12:30 am	2.10	—N/a	
2013	Late night	11:00 pm–12:00 am	1.73	0.5	
2013	Late night	12:00 am–12:30 am	2.83	0.9	
2013	Late night	12:30 am–1:05 am	1.44	0.5	
2014	Full program	9:00 pm–12:30 am	1.60	0.6	
2014	Prime time	9:00 pm–10:00 pm	1.05	—N/a	
2014	Prime time	10:00 pm–11:00 pm	1.23	—N/a	
2014	Late night	11:00 pm–12:00 am	2.00	—N/a	
2014	Late night	11:00 pm–12:30 am	2.20	—N/a	
2014	Late night	12:30 am–1:05 am	1.44	0.5	
2015	Full program	8:00 pm–12:38 am	1.62	0.5	
2015	Late night	10:00 pm–12:30 am	2.07	—N/a	
2015	Late night	11:00 pm–12:30 am	2.54	—N/a	
2015	Late night	11:30 pm–12:30 am	2.87	—N/a	
2015	Late night	12:38 am–1:05 am	1.75	0.5	
2016	Full program	8:00 pm–12:30 am	1.89	0.5	
2016	Full program	8:00 pm–1:00 am	1.92	—N/a	
2016	Prime time	8:00 pm–11:00 pm	1.32	—N/a	
2016	Late night	11:00 pm–12:30 am	3.04	—N/a	
2016	Late night	12:30 am–1:00 am	2.11	0.7	
2017	Full program	8:00 pm–12:30 am	2.23	0.6	
2017	Prime time	8:00 pm–11:00 pm	1.70	—N/a	
2017	Late night	11:00 pm–12:30 am	3.28	—N/a	
2017	Late night	12:30 am–1:05 am	2.34	0.7	
2018	Full program	8:00 pm–12:30 am	2.23	0.6	
2018	Prime time	8:00 pm–11:00 pm		—N/a	
2018	Late night	11:00 pm–12:30 am	3.28	—N/a	
2018	Late night	12:30 am–1:05 am			
2019	Full program	8:00 pm–12:30 am			
2019	Prime time	8:00 pm–11:00 pm		—N/a	
2019	Late night	11:00 pm–12:30 am		—N/a	
2019	Late night	12:30 am–1:05 am			
