= Kay =

- Pronunciation: K
- Gender: Unisex

Other names
- Related names: Katty, Kaye, Kayanna, Kail, Kayla, Kaylee, Kaylin, Kaylynn, Kaylinn

The name Kay is both a surname and a given name. In English-speaking countries, it is usually a feminine name, often a short form of Katherine or one of its variants; but it is also used as a first name in its own right, and also as a masculine name (for example in India, the Netherlands, and Sweden).

== Women ==
- Kay Adams (sportscaster) (born 1986), American sportscaster and television personality
- Kay Adams (curler) (born 1987), Scottish curler
- Kay Armen (1915–2011), stage name of Armenuhi Manoogian, American Armenian singer
- Kay Curley Bennett (1922–1997), Navajo artist and writer
- Kay Boyle (1902–1992), American writer
- Kay Burley (born 1960), Sky News presenter
- Kay B. Cobb (1942–2023), American judge
- Kay Copland, Scottish sport shooter
- Kay Elson (born 1947), Australian politician
- Kay Francis (1905–1968), American actress
- Kay Hagan (1953–2019), American politician
- Kay Hull (born 1954), Australian politician
- Kay Bailey Hutchison (born 1943), American lawyer, politician, and diplomat
- Kay Ivey (born 1944), governor of Alabama
- Kay Kendall (1927–1959), British actress and comedian
- Kay Kinsman (1909–1998), Canadian artist and writer
- Kay Lahusen (1930–2021), American photographer, writer and gay rights activist
- Kay Matheson (1928–2013), teacher, Gaelic scholar, one of four students involved in the 1950 removal of the Stone of Scone
- Kay Mazzo (born 1946), American ballet dancer and educator
- Kay A. Orr (1939), 36th governor of Nebraska, US
- Kay Toinette Oslin (1942–2020), American country music singer-songwriter
- Kay Panabaker (born 1990), American actress
- Kay Parker (1944–2022), English pornographic actress
- Kay Purcell (1963–2020), English actress
- Kay Redfield Jamison (born 1946), American psychologist and writer
- Kay Starr (1922–2016), stage name of Katherine Starks, American pop and jazz singer
- Kay Thompson (1909–1998), American author
- Kay Tse (born 1977), Hong Kong Cantopop singer
- Kay (singer) (born 1985), Canadian singer-songwriter
- F. Kay Wallis (born c. 1944), American traditional healer and politician
- Kay Young (born 1944), Canadian politician

== Men ==
- Kay Bell, American football player and professional wrestler
- Kay Christofferson, American politician
- Kay van Dijk, Dutch volleyball player
- Kay Jäger (born 1992), German politician
- Kay Kyser, American bandleader and radio personality
- Kay Larsen, Danish author and historian
- Kay Nielsen, Danish illustrator
- Kay Pollak, Swedish film director
- Kay Stephenson, American football player and coach
- Prince Kay One, German singer and rapper
- Jay Kay, British musician and frontman of British band Jamiroquai

== Fiction ==
- Agent K, a character in the Men In Black film series and animated series
- Kay Adams Corleone, a character in Mario Puzo's novel The Godfather
- Kay (Arthurian legend), a knightly character from Arthurian legend
- Kay Harker, character from the book The Box of Delights by John Masefield
- Kay, a protagonist in the video game Legend of Kay
- Kay, also spelled Kai, a character in Hans Christian Andersen's fairy tale The Snow Queen
- Kay, a character in the Vertigo comic series Fables, based on the above
- Kay Faraday, a character in Ace Attorney Investigations: Miles Edgeworth
- Kay Engel, a character in Freier Fall (2013 film)
- Kay, protagonist from the video game Sea of Solitude
- Kay Stone, Gwyneth Paltrow's character in Marty Supreme
- Kay Swiss, a character in Scott the Woz

== See also ==
- K, the eleventh letter in the Latin alphabet
- Kai
- Kay (surname)
- Kay Musical Instrument Company, a US musical instrument manufacturer
- Hurricane Kay (disambiguation)
- Kaya (disambiguation)
- Kaye (disambiguation)
- Kayla (disambiguation)
- Kaylee
