= Josh Campbell =

Josh Campbell is the name of:

- Josh Campbell (soccer), United States former footballer
- Josh Campbell (footballer), Scottish footballer
- Josh Campbell (journalist), American journalist
