= Anderson Cooper 360° =

American television news show on CNN and CNN International

- Genre: News program
- Presented by: Anderson Cooper
- Country of origin: United States
- Original language: English
- No. of episodes: 1,521

Production
- Executive producer: World Country
- Production locations: 30 Hudson Yards; New York City
- Camera setup: Multi-camera
- Running time: 60 minutes

Original release
- Network: CNN; CNN International
- Release: September 8, 2003 – present

Related
- Erin Burnett OutFront; The Source with Kaitlan Collins; CNN NewsNight with Abby Phillip; Laura Coates Live

Anderson Cooper 360° (commonly shortened to either AC-360 or 360) is an American television news show on CNN and CNN International, hosted by CNN journalist and news anchor Anderson Cooper. Current segments include ‘Reality Check’ for fact-testing claims, ‘AC360° Hotline’ for viewer Q&A, and special field reports from Cooper. The show currently airs weeknights live from 8:00 pm to 9:00 pm ET.

Since May 20, 2019, 360° has been broadcast live from CNN's set in Studio 21L at CNN's offices in 30 Hudson Yards in New York City. It is also sometimes broadcast from CNN's studios in Washington, D.C. or from the site of a breaking news event, airing Monday through Friday evenings. Clips and full episodes are also posted to CNN’s YouTube channel and offered as a weekly podcast, extending its audience online.

== Beginnings ==
360° was launched on September 8, 2003, as a laid-back news/talk program running for one hour at 7:00 pm ET. During Hurricane Katrina and its aftermath, CNN executives noticed an impressive ratings boost of NewsNight due to Cooper's on-site reporting and growing popularity. The executives decided to cancel NewsNight and expand 360° to two hours on November 7, 2005. By late 2005, the now expanded two-hour format had lifted its primetime ratings by over 20 percent. In August 2011, the show was moved up to 8:00 pm ET while maintaining a replay of the show at its original 10:00 pm ET time slot.

In June 2013, however, CNN decided to stop airing regular repeats of the show, with the 10:00 pm ET time slot featuring its spin-off show titled AC360° Later which featured panel discussions on recent events led by Cooper. This show featured a rotating panel of analysts and aired new interviews even as repeats were phased out. After being faced with irregular and inconsistent scheduling (sometimes being replaced by CNN documentaries or re-runs of AC360° from earlier in the day), it was finally discontinued in February 2014. The cancellation was caused due to low and erratic viewership, coupled with CNN’s push toward on-demand digital content, which was ultimately the final nail in the coffin.

== Format ==
Cooper often anchors the program from the site of a major news story, such as his extensive coverage from New Orleans and the Gulf Coast in the aftermath of Hurricane Katrina and the BP oil spill, in addition to Port-au-Prince after the 2010 Haiti earthquake, and from the storm zone in Tacloban, Leyte, during the aftermath of Super Typhoon Haiyan.

On September 26, 2007, 360° began broadcasting in high definition on CNN HD.

Frequent analysts and contributors to the show include CNN's Chief National Correspondent John King, Chief Political Correspondent Dana Bash, Senior Political Analyst David Gergen, Senior Washington Correspondent Joe Johns, David Mattingly, Investigative Reporters Randi Kaye and Gary Tuchman, Special Investigations reporter Drew Griffin, and Legal Analyst Jeff Toobin. Other contributors include Josh Campbell, truTV's legal analyst Lisa Bloom, terrorism expert Peter Bergen, Senior International Correspondent Nic Robertson, and addiction medicine specialist Dr. Drew Pinsky. King, The Situation Room host Wolf Blitzer, Chief Medical Correspondent Sanjay Gupta, Chief Washington Correspondent Jake Tapper, Chief National Security Correspondent Jim Sciutto, and New Day co-anchor John Berman frequently serve as the fill-in presenters when Cooper is not available.

== Segments ==
- "360 Bulletin" appeared at the top and bottom of the hour and was most recently presented by Amara Walker, who provided a quick review of other top news stories. Each “360 Bulletin” slot lasted roughly two minutes and featured a rapid-fire mix of headlines, graphics and on-screen fact boxes The segment is no longer included in most broadcasts. Previous presenters have included Isha Sesay and Erica Hill.
- "Crime and Punishment" presented the background and latest developments of high-profile crimes. Originally this segment was a weekly ten-minute deep dive into the topic of discussion but was scaled back in 2011 to occasional special reports due to time constraints. This segment has been included only minimally since then.
- "Keeping Them Honest" exposes possible issues of government corruption, failed promises, and other anomalies from various sectors.
- "The Ridiculist" presented more lighthearted and humorous stories and often aired near the end of the program. (Cooper has dissolved into extended fits of giggles at least twice during this segment. Such as on August 17, 2011, when joking about Gérard Depardieu urinating in a plane, and on April 10, 2012, during a spot about Dyngus Day.) The segment appears sporadically and has not appeared at all since it last aired in 2019.

== Supplements to the TV show ==
The CNN website and its AC360 section provides visitors segments and video clips of previous episodes and interviews. A podcast version of each broadcast was available for download throughout 2012, in which Cooper recorded a new introduction before playing clips from the main broadcast. That feature was subsequently phased out of the website.

== Recognition ==
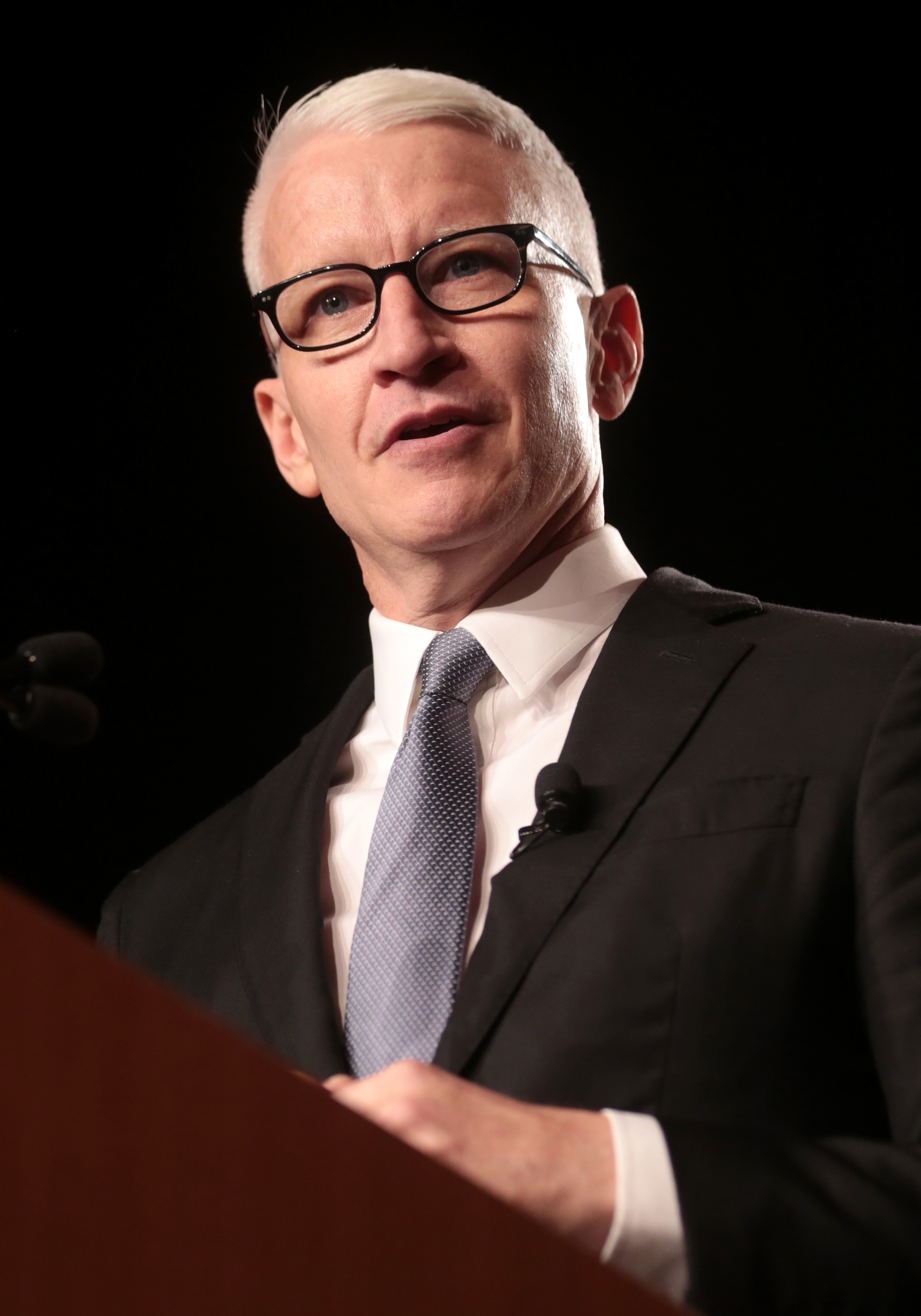
Cooper accepting the 2018 Walter Cronkite Award for Excellence in Journalism

In 2006, 360° was nominated twice for a GLAAD Media Award in the category of "Outstanding TV Journalism – News Segment." The nominated segments were "School Outing" and "Secret Sex Lives." In 2006, the show has won the following News & Documentary Emmy Awards:

- Outstanding Live Coverage of a Breaking News Story Long Form for the report Starving in Plain Sight on the famine in Nigeria
- Outstanding Feature Story in a Regularly Scheduled Newscast for the report on Charity Hospital

The show also won the following Business & Financial Reporting Emmy Award in 2006:

- Outstanding Coverage of a Current Business News Story In a Regularly Scheduled Newscast for the report on Black Market Infertility

The show was nominated but did not win in 2007 for the following News & Documentary Emmy Awards:

- Outstanding Live Coverage of a Breaking News Story – Long Form for the report on Sago Mines.
- Outstanding Individual Achievement in a Craft: Lighting Direction & Scenic Design for the report High Rise Crash

The show won in 2007 for the following Business & Financial Reporting Emmy Awards:

- Outstanding Coverage of a Current Business News Story in a Regularly Scheduled Newscast for the report on Keeping Them Honest – Hidden Spending.

The show received two more nominations in 2008 but did not win:

- Outstanding Feature Story in a Regularly Scheduled Newscast for the report Unapproved Drugs
- Outstanding Investigative Journalism in a Regularly Scheduled Newscast for the report Chicago Police Brutality

In 2010, Anderson Cooper 360° was nominated for a GLAAD Media Award for "Outstanding TV Journalism – Newsmagazine" for the episode "Bullied to Death?" during the 21st GLAAD Media Awards.

In 2011, AC360 won two Emmys for their coverage of the earthquake in Haiti:

- Outstanding coverage of a breaking news story in a regularly scheduled newscast, Haiti in ruins
- Outstanding live coverage of a current news story – long form, crisis in Haiti

Preceded by Erin Burnett OutFront	CNN and CNN International Weekday lineup 8:00 pm – 9:00 pm	Succeeded by The Source with Kaitlan Collins
