= Margaret Kay =

Bundjalung museum owner and sacred site caretaker

Margaret Kay (circa 1904 – 5 November 1967) was a Bundjalung museum owner and caretaker of a sacred site which, through her efforts, was first gazetted as a reserve and then incorporated into a national park.

== Biography ==
Kay was born in the Richmond River area at Broadwater, New South Wales to a Minyangbal mother. At the age of ten, she was removed with her brother by the Aboriginal Protection Board to a home at Parramatta, in western Sydney. She then entered domestic service with a family called Arthur, for whom she worked from about 1918 until the late 1950s, firstly in Sydney, and from about 1930 in Queensland, at a station near Julia Creek. Kay received a bequest of £50 at Mrs Arthur's death in 1948, and in the late 1950s, retired and bought a house at Tweed Heads, on the north coast of New South Wales.

Kay located a bora ring near Tweed Heads, which she had been shown by relatives. It was overgrown and the mounds were being worn away. Kay cleared and restored it and a nearby traditional well. She successfully lobbied the Tweed Shire Council to have the area preserved; it was gazetted in 1961 as a Nature Reserve for "the Preservation of Aboriginal Relics", at a period when conserving Aboriginal sites was unusual.

Kay led school students on conducted tours, explaining the history and significance of the site. In 1980, its management was taken over by the NSW National Parks & Wildlife Service, and it was declared a Historic Site. In 2011, on the 50th anniversary of the gazetting of the South Tweed Heads reserve (and coincidentally the 40th anniversary of the appointment of Neville Bonner, the first Aboriginal senator in Australia, who was born on nearby Ukerebagh Island), the Senate of Australia acknowledged Kay's work in conserving Aboriginal heritage, at a time when that was rare.

Kay also collected Aboriginal artefacts, which she displayed in her home as an Aboriginal museum. Kay herself made coloured sand art in bottles, sand paintings and shell work in addition to crocheting, sewing, painting and drawing. Late in her life, she took part in the opening ceremony of the Opal Hostel for Aborigines in Brisbane, giving Queensland governor Sir Henry Abel Smith an official gift.

Kay had hypertension and diabetes for some years before her death from infectious hepatitis at the Murwillumbah Hospital on 5 November 1967.

The Lower Tweed River Historical Society was able to purchase her artefacts and some of Kay's artworks, including are held in the Minjungbal Aboriginal Cultural Centre and Museum.
