= George Kay =

George Kay may refer to:

- George Kay (footballer), English footballer and manager
- George Kay (minister), Scottish minister
- George Kay (writer), English screenwriter
- George Frederick Kay, American geologist

== See also ==
- George Kaye (disambiguation)
- George Coleman De Kay, American naval officer
