= Mr. K =

Mr. K may refer to the following:

- Mr. K, a character in Renegade
- Mr. Kobayashi, a character in The Law of Ueki
- Mr. K, a fictional character in Go On
- Marc Germain (born 1967), radio talk host known as Mr. KFI, Mr. KABC, or simply Mr. K
- Yutaka Katayama (1909–2015), Japanese automotive executive
- Mr. Nikita Khrushchev (1894–1971), Soviet leader
- Mr. K (film), a 2024 surrealist mystery drama film

== See also ==
- Kay (surname)
- Mister K, working title for the film The Spy: Undercover Operation
