= Heather Bonner =

Australian Indigenous rights activist

Heather Bonner (1923–2004) was an Australian Indigenous rights activist, the wife of the first Australian Indigenous Senator, Neville Bonner.

== Early life ==
Heather Ray Trotter (later Bonner) was born on 3 September 1923 in Ipswich, Queensland, the daughter of Richard Trotter and his wife Lucinda. Her grandfather Hugh Sinclair had been a Queensland politician and Manager of the Queensland Farmers Cooperative Association Factory in Booval. She attended Silkstone State School and Ipswich Girls Grammar School. She worked as a book keeper in the Brisbane Markets in Roma Street, Brisbane after she completed her schooling and was active in the Ipswich Scouting movement.

== War service and war bride ==
In 1942, Heather Trotter joined the Australian Women's Army Service (AWAS). She served as a Confidential Secretary to General Durrant in the army's Victoria Barracks. She married USN Petty Officer Robert Harrison in 1944 and sailed as a war bride to California where their daughter was born. The family moved to naval bases in Florida where her husband died following a car accident. She married another naval officer, David Ryan some years later and their two children were born. After suffering from spousal abuse, Heather divorced her husband and she and her children left Florida and they returned to Australia in 1957 to live with her father. She had become close friends with a couple who were First Nation Americans while she lived in Washington state.

== Work with One People of Australia League ==
Heather became involved with two organisations as part of the South East Queensland community. She joined the Christian Anti-Communists Crusade and OPAL (One People of Australia League), an organisation that was formed to encourage Indigenous and non-Indigenous Australians in their efforts toward welfare and political solutions to Indigenous issues. Heather was an active member of OPAL in Ipswich, and opened her home to Murri and non-Murri members of the organisation, as well as offering counselling and support. Neville Bonner was President of OPAL from 1968 to 1975, and Heather mixed with Neville and his wife Mona Bonner in their shared league work.

After the death of Mona Bonner in 1969, Heather and Neville Bonner developed a closer friendship and they married in 1972. He was the first Indigenous Australian man to be appointed and then elected to the Australian Senate in 1971. They continued to live in Ipswich and raise his sons and step-daughters, as well as her three children. They were also active in Liberal party politics.

== Legacy ==
Heather Bonner died in October 2004, having nursed her husband Neville who died in 1999. She administered Neville Bonner scholarships and legacies after his death and continued to provide advice to the Indigenous community and Jagera people. A Heather Bonner Memorial Scholarship was offered from 2006 to 2015 for an Ipswich woman to study at university.
