= The Trust: A Game of Greed =

American television reality game show

- Promotional poster
- Genre: Reality game show
- Presented by: Brooke Baldwin
- Country of origin: United States
- Original language: English
- No. of seasons: 1
- No. of episodes: 8

Production
- Executive producers: Ben Newmark; Dan Newmark; Jeff Spangler; Rob LaPlante; David Friedman
- Running time: 43–61 minutes
- Production companies: Grandma's House Entertainment; Lighthearted Entertainment

Original release
- Network: Netflix
- Release: January 10 – January 24, 2024

The Trust: A Game of Greed is an American reality game show broadcast on Netflix in 2024. Eleven strangers are offered $250,000 split equally among themselves and have to decide whether to eliminate each other and whether to accept offers that affect the money in the prize pot.

== Format ==
A communal pot of $250,000 is initially shared equally among 11 contestants who socialize together in a luxury villa. Trust Ceremonies are held in which each contestant is given the opportunity to vote a contestant out of the game. The person who receives the most votes is eliminated, but there is no elimination in the case of a tie or no votes.

Participants play games that can add money to the prize pot. These include games that reveal secrets about each other, games that ask them to rank each other based on personality and games that ask them to reveal their voting history. Some contestants are offered access to The Vault, which gives them the opportunity to take an offer, which could benefit themselves or the group. The series is hosted by journalist Brooke Baldwin.

== Contestants ==
Name	Age	Occupation	Result	Winnings
Brian Firebaugh	42	Rancher	Winner	$78,600
Tolú Ekundare	26	Marketing Manager	Winner	$73,600
Julie Theis	28	Businessperson	Winner	$63,600
Gaspare Randazzo	33	Teacher	Winner	$48,600
Jake Chocholous	37	Military Contractor	Winner	$48,600
Lindsey Anderson	43	Business Coach	Eliminated	$0
Winnie Ileso	31	Bartender	Eliminated	$20,000
Jay Patterson	70	Retired	Self-eliminated	$25,000
Bryce Lee	22	Realtor	Eliminated	$0
Simone Stewart	55	Unemployed	Eliminated	$0
Juelz Morgan	32	Police Officer	Eliminated	$0

=== Future appearances ===
In 2024, Tolú Ekundare appeared on the second season of Perfect Match.

== The Vault ==
Color key:

Offer declined
Offer accepted

Vault history
Episode	Recipients	Offer 1	Offer 2	Result	Trust Total
1	Juelz; Simone	$5,000 added to the Trust, block two people's votes.	$2,500 each from the Trust, if someone is eliminated.	Bryce and Tolú's votes were blocked, $5,000 added to the trust.	$255,000
2	Bryce; Gaspare	$10,000 subtracted from the Trust, give one person immunity.	$5,000 each from the Trust, if they cast a vote for the same person.	Julie received immunity, $10,000 subtracted from the trust.	$245,000
3	Bryce; Jake	$2,000 added to the Trust for each person who does not vote.	$10,000 each from the Trust, if someone is eliminated.	$18,000 added to the trust.	$263,000
4	Brian	(Blind offer); Offer was not revealed.	None	Offer declined.	$248,000
4	Julie	(Blind offer) $15,000 taken from the Trust if the next person they vote for goes home.	None	Julie voted for Bryce, and Bryce went home. $15,000 subtracted from the trust	$248,000
5	Winnie	(Blind offer) $20,000 taken from the Trust; they are eliminated if no one else is eliminated.	None	Winnie was eliminated. $20,000 subtracted from the trust.	$228,000
6	Jay	$25,000 taken from the Trust, they are eliminated immediately.	None	Jay self-eliminated. $25,000 subtracted from the trust.	$203,000
7	Brian	(Blind offer) $30,000 taken from the Trust; three random votes are blocked.	None	Julie, Jake, and Brian's votes were blocked. $30,000 subtracted from the trust.	$173,000
7	Everyone	$60,000 added to the Trust if everyone reveals their voting history or $5,000 per person.	None	Everyone revealed their voting history. $60,000 added to the trust.	$268,000
8	Everyone	An amount up to $25,000 taken from the Trust and given to the highest bidder.	None	Tolú accepted the offer with a bid of $25,000.	$243,000

== Voting history ==
Color key:

Winner(s)
Did not vote
Self-eliminated
Eliminated
Vote blocked
Immune from Elimination

Voting history
Episode	1		3	4	5	6	7	8	
Brian	No vote	No vote	No vote	No vote	No vote	Winnie	Blocked	No vote	Winner (Episode 8)
Tolú	No vote	~~Juelz~~	No vote	No vote	Bryce	Lindsey	Lindsey	No vote	Winner (Episode 8)
Julie	No vote	Juelz	Simone	No vote	Bryce	No vote	Blocked	No vote	Winner (Episode 8)
Gaspare	No vote	No vote	No vote	No vote	No vote	Winnie	Lindsey	No vote	Winner (Episode 8)
Jake	No vote	No vote	No vote	No vote	No vote	Winnie	Blocked	No vote	Winner (Episode 8)
Lindsey	No vote	Juelz	No vote	No vote	Bryce	Winnie	Tolú	Eliminated (Episode 7)	
Winnie	No vote	Juelz	No vote	No vote	Bryce	Lindsey	Eliminated (Episode 7)		
Jay	No vote	No vote	Simone	No vote	No vote	Accepted Offer (Episode 6)			
Bryce	No vote	Blocked	No vote	No vote	No vote	Eliminated (Episode 5)			
Simone	No vote	No vote	No vote	Eliminated (Episode 3)					
Juelz	No vote	No vote	Eliminated (Episode 1)						
Eliminated	None	Juelz; 3 of 3 votes	Simone; 2 of 2 votes	None	Bryce; 4 of 4 votes	Winnie; 4 of 6 votes	Lindsey; 2 of 3 votes	None	Brian; Tolú; Julie; Gaspare; Jake

== Episodes ==
No.	Title	Original release date
1	"House of Lies"	10 January 2024
2	"Why Is Everyone Being so Frickin' Emotional?"	10 January 2024
3	"And That Changes Everything..."	10 January 2024
4	"My Integrity Can't Be Bought"	10 January 2024
5	"Selfishness Is NOT Black And White"	17 January 2024
6	"Snake In The Grass"	17 January 2024
7	"The Snake Is Slithering"	17 January 2024
8	"The End of the Rainbow"	24 January 2024

== Production ==
The series was filmed over roughly three weeks in Casa Kimbal, Cabrera, Dominican Republic.

== Analysis ==
The series drew comparison to The Traitors, a Dutch reality game show franchise that divides contestants into Faithfuls, who aim to win games, and Traitors, who aim to sabotage and eliminate people. The Trust explores human behavior and psychology: alliances form immediately on the basis of gender. The production sows mistrust by revealing that one contestant is a millionaire and using divide-and-conquer tactics, such as singling people out to receive Vault offers.

== Reception ==
The series has a 57% rating on Rotten Tomatoes, based on seven reviews. Richard Roeper of the Chicago Sun-Times gave the show a positive review, writing "We know what to expect, and 'The Trust' delivers, from the suspenseful techno-beat soundtrack to the swooping overhead drone camera shots to the 'confession room' interviews." Rebecca Nicholson of The Guardian gave the series 3 out of 5 stars, calling it "a budget bootleg version of The Traitors". Steve Greene of IGN wrote that the premise was unoriginal but the show had "tiny flashes of something interesting under the surface that keeps The Trust from feeling completely unnecessary.
