= Kaye (surname) =

- Pronunciation: /ˈkeɪ/
- Language: English

Origin
- Languages: Old English (also Breton Cornish, Welsh and Latin)
- Derivation: "cai", "key" (wharf) "coeg" (key)
- Meaning: "wharf" or "key"

Other names
- Variant form: Kay

Kaye is an English surname (from the old English kaie). In England, the Kayes of Lancashire and Yorkshire included the Kaye family of Woodesham, Yorkshire.

Notable people with this surname include:

== Music ==
- Carol Kaye, American electric bass player
- Charlene Kaye, American singer
- Dave Kaye, British pianist
- Florence Kaye (1919–2006), American songwriter
- Judy Kaye, American actress and singer
- Lenny Kaye, musician
- Mary Kaye, American guitarist
- Sammy Kaye, American bandleader and songwriter
- Tony Kaye (musician), British keyboard player

== Politics ==
- Frederick A. Kaye (1796–1866), fourth and sixth mayor of Louisville, Kentucky
- John Kaye (politician) (1955–2016), Australian academic and politician
- Loz Kaye, British musician, composer, activist and politician
- Nikki Kaye (1980–2024), New Zealand politician
- William Kaye (1813–1890), fourteenth mayor of Louisville, Kentucky

== Sports ==
- Alicia Kaye (born 1983), Canadian-American triathlete
- James Kaye (born 1964), British racing driver
- Jonathan Kaye (born 1970), professional golfer on PGA Tour
- Mark-Anthony Kaye (born 1994), Canadian association football midfielder
- Matthew Kaye (born 1974), American professional wrestler
- Peter Kaye (born 1979), English association football forward

== Television and film ==
- Caren Kaye, American actress
- Celia Kaye, American actress
- Danny Kaye, American actor and comedian
- Darwood "Waldo" Kaye, American actor and minister
- David Kaye, Canadian voice actor
- Gorden Kaye, British actor
- Ivan Kaye, British actor
- Linda Kaye, American actress
- Norman Kaye, Australian actor
- Paul Kaye, British actor and comedian
- Randi Kaye, investigative reporter for CNN
- Sadie Kaye, Hong Kong TV presenter
- Stubby Kaye, American comic actor
- Thorsten Kaye, German actor
- Tony Kaye (director), British film director

== Literature ==
- M. M. Kaye, British novelist
- Marilyn Kaye, American children's author
- Sheila Kaye-Smith, British novelist

== Other ==
- Sir Emmanuel Kaye, British businessman
- John William Kaye, British military historian
- John Lister-Kaye, British naturalist
- Jonathan Kaye (linguist), linguist
- Judith Kaye, American judge
- Martin Kaye (1919–1977), British Anglican priest
- Mel Kaye, programmer of legend
- Nora Kaye, American ballerina
- Otis Kaye, American artist
- Wendy Kaye, American model

== See also ==
- Kay (surname)
- Kaye baronets
