= Kaye =

Kaye may refer to:

- Kaye (given name)
- Kaye (surname)
- Kayes, city in Mali, sometimes also spelled Kaye.
- the ICAO code for Moore Army Airfield
- KAYE-FM, a radio station (90.7 FM) licensed to Tonkawa, Oklahoma, United States
- Charlene Kaye, American singer who has recorded under the name "KAYE"

== See also ==
- Kaye effect, a physical property of complex liquids
