= Brooke Baldwin =

American journalist and television host (born 1979)

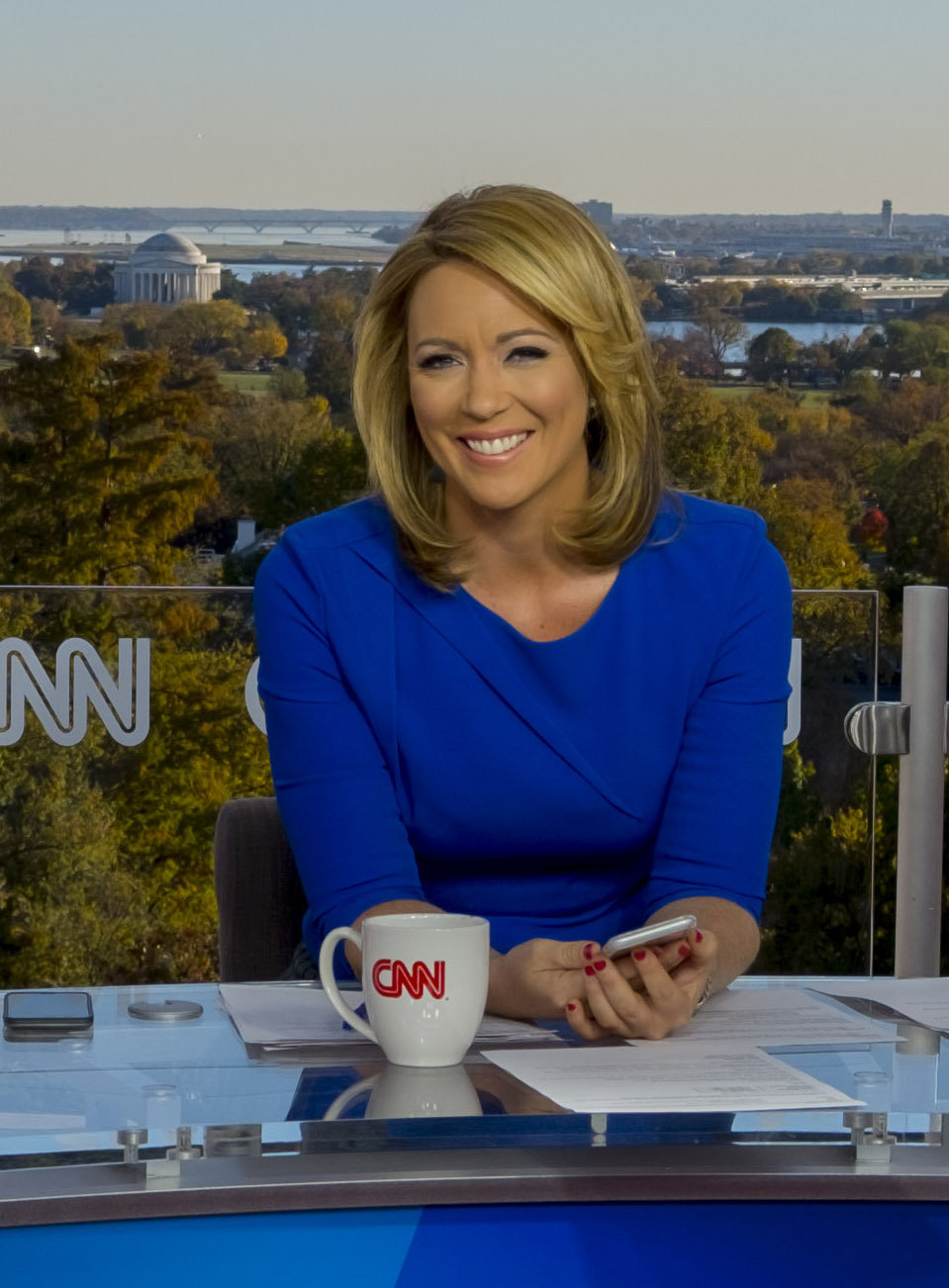
- Baldwin on set in Washington, D.C., 2016
- Born: Lauren Brooke Baldwin; July 12, 1979 (age 47); Atlanta, Georgia, U.S.
- Education: University of North Carolina at Chapel Hill (BA); Universidad Iberoamericana
- Occupations: News anchor, writer
- Employer: CNN (2008–2021)
- Television: CNN Newsroom
- Spouse: James Fletcher (m. 2018; div. 2023)

Lauren Brooke Baldwin (born July 12, 1979) is an American journalist, television presenter, and writer. From 2008 to 2021, she was an anchor and correspondent for CNN, hosting the weekday afternoon program CNN Newsroom with Brooke Baldwin from 2014 to 2021.

== Early life and education ==
Brooke Baldwin was born in Atlanta, Georgia, where she attended The Westminster Schools, a private college-preparatory school, and later, the University of North Carolina at Chapel Hill, in Chapel Hill, North Carolina. She graduated in 2001, earning a bachelor's degree with a double major in Spanish language and journalism. Her undergraduate studies also included attending the Universidad Iberoamericana in Mexico City.

== Career ==
Baldwin began her career in 2001 at WVIR-TV in Charlottesville, Virginia, and later became the morning anchor at WOWK-TV in the Huntington and Charleston, West Virginia, area. She later joined WTTG in Washington, D.C., as lead reporter for the 10 p.m. newscast.

=== CNN ===
Baldwin joined CNN in 2008 and was based at CNN's Atlanta world headquarters until 2014. She anchored CNN Newsroom with Brooke Baldwin on weekdays and has been based in New York City since 2014.

On July 8, 2011, Baldwin co-anchored CNN's special coverage of the final launch of Space Shuttle Atlantis (STS-135) from Kennedy Space Center.

Baldwin's documentary To Catch a Serial Killer won a Silver World Medal for Best Investigative Report at the New York Festivals International Television & Film Awards in 2012. She was nominated for an Emmy Award for her coverage of the New York City chokehold-death protests in the wake of Eric Garner's death 2014.

Baldwin covered U.S. president Barack Obama's second inauguration in January 2013 from Washington, D.C.

In 2015, Baldwin hosted a town hall in Washington, D.C., on gun violence, for which she was a Peabody Award finalist.

Baldwin was criticized during the 2015 Baltimore protests when she incorrectly attributed comments she heard that veterans were responsible for the unrest – saying soldiers who become police officers "are coming back from war, they don't know the communities, and they're ready to do battle." She later apologized via Twitter and on-air the next day. In The Washington Post, Erik Wemple wrote, "CNN's Brooke Baldwin shows rest of media how to apologize".

In June 2016, Baldwin reported live from Orlando, Florida, covering the victims and survivors of the Orlando nightclub shooting.

On January 20, 2017, she covered U.S. president Donald Trump's first inauguration.

On February 16, 2021, Baldwin announced that she would leave CNN in mid-April. She hosted her final show on April 16.

=== New Year's Eve Live ===
From 2010 to 2020, Baldwin hosted a segment of CNN's New Year's Eve Live with CNN anchor Anderson Cooper, and previously alongside comedian Kathy Griffin, broadcasting live from New Orleans with CNN anchor Don Lemon. Previously, Baldwin hosted from Nashville, Tennessee, in 2010 and 2011.

=== CNN.com ===
Published	Title
March 18, 2015	Conquering Mount Kilimanjaro: 10 essential lessons
October 8, 2015	Finding the meaning of home in Africa
December 3, 2015	Brooke Baldwin: There's been a shooting ... again
April 18, 2016	Brooke Baldwin: I'm reporting on a world at war. He's fighting in one
April 20, 2016	4 flights, an aircraft carrier, and a helicopter
September 18, 2017	Brooke Baldwin: Speaking like this to women in 2017? No way
January 19, 2018	American Woman with Brooke Baldwin

=== American Woman ===
In 2017, CNN commissioned Baldwin's series American Woman featuring Sheryl Crow, Betty White, Ava DuVernay, Diane von Fürstenberg, Issa Rae, Ashley Graham, Tracy Reese, and Pat Benatar.

=== Huddle ===
Baldwin published her first book, Huddle: How Women Unlock Their Collective Power in April 2021. In the book, she interviews multiple women including Ava DuVernay, Stacey Abrams, and Gloria Steinem about the power women have when they join.

=== The Trust ===
On December 8, 2023, Baldwin was announced as the host of a new American reality TV series, The Trust: A Game of Greed exploring the psychology of people when presented with potential financial reward. The first four episodes were released on Netflix on January 10, 2024, with new episodes then released weekly.

== In the media ==
In April 2015, Variety featured her in "Brooke Baldwin Gives Surprising Boost to CNN". In December 2015, The New York Times interviewed Baldwin after writing an op-ed on CNN.com about covering mass shootings in America. Marie Claire magazine interviewed her on the subject of covering mass shootings.

In 2016, Elle magazine featured Baldwin as one of five female correspondents during the election year of 2016. New York's Downtown magazine featured Baldwin in October 2016.

On the television show Saturday Night Live, Baldwin was parodied in a sketch featuring Cecily Strong and Alec Baldwin in October 2016, the week after the release of the Donald Trump Access Hollywood tape.

In 2017, Baldwin was featured in a Variety magazine article "Women Surge to Top of TV News in Face of Sexism".

== Clay Travis incident ==
On September 15, 2017, Clay Travis appeared as a guest on CNN with Baldwin to discuss free speech, specifically whether ESPN personality Jemele Hill should be fired for calling Donald Trump a "white supremacist" and stating that police officers were "modern day slave catchers" on her personal Twitter page. Travis stated that it would be bad policy on ESPN's part to fire Hill for her private comments, just as it was bad policy when ESPN fired Curt Schilling for comments he made regarding transgender bathrooms on his personal Facebook page. Travis received criticism for using a phrase he commonly used on his radio show when he said "...I'm a First Amendment absolutist - the only two things I 100 percent believe in are the First Amendment and boobs..." Baldwin cut the interview short and later responded, "when I first heard 'boobs' from a grown man on national television (in 2017!!!) my initial thought bubble was: 'Did I hear that correctly??...'"

== Speaking engagements ==
Baldwin hosted the AK100 Club event for the travel agency Abercrombie and Kent, and gave a speech, based upon her March 2015 climb up Mount Kilimanjaro.

Also in 2016, Baldwin presented an award at L'Oréal Paris 11th Annual Women of Worth Celebration. Other presenters included Blake Lively, Andie MacDowell, Diane Keaton, Aimee Mullins, L'Oréal USA president Karen Fondu, Tamron Hall, Arianna Huffington, Liya Kebede, Karlie Kloss and Eva Longoria at The Pierre on November 16 in New York City.

In 2017, Baldwin spoke at the 7th annual Neighbor Celebration in Washington, D.C. for Blue Star Families where former First Lady Rosalynn Carter was honored on March 30, 2017.

Baldwin hosted Mother Nature Network's White House Correspondents' Jam at Hamilton Live, Washington, D.C., in April 2017 – featuring headlining band, The Boxmasters, with actor Billy Bob Thornton and Rolling Stones' keyboardist Chuck Leavell.

Baldwin gave the commencement address at The University of North Carolina at Chapel Hill on May 14, 2017.

== Personal life ==
In July 2017, Baldwin revealed that she was engaged to English producer James Fletcher. They were married in May 2018, in a ceremony at Liberty Farms in Ghent, New York. In February 2023, Baldwin filed for divorce.

== See also ==
- New Yorkers in journalism
