= Kaye (given name) =

Kaye is a feminine given name. Notable people with the name include:

- Kaye Abad, Filipino-American actress
- Kaye Adams (presenter), British television presenter
- Kaye Ballard, American actress who has appeared on Broadway and on television
- Kaye Bell, American jockey
- Kaye Coppoolse, Dutch footballer
- Kaye Dacus, American author
- Kaye Darveniza, Australian politician
- Kaye Don, Irish speedboat racer
- Kaye Elhardt, American actress
- Kaye Forster, British weather presenter
- Kaye Gibbons, American author
- Kaye Hall, American competition swimmer
- Kaye Kory, American politician
- Kaye Stevens, American actress and singer
- Kaye Thorn, New Zealand professor of management
- Kaye Umansky, British children's author and poet
- Kaye Webb, British journalist and publisher
- Kaye Wragg, British actress
