= George Kaye =

George Kaye may refer to:

- Harry Kaye (George Kaye), English footballer
- G. W. C. Kaye (George William Clarkson Kaye), English physicist

== See also ==
- George Kay (disambiguation)
