= Gary Tuchman =

American TV reporter (born 1960)

- Born: October 2, 1960 (age 66)
- Education: Pascack Valley High School, New Jersey; Boston University
- Occupation: Reporter
- Employer: CNN (formerly)
- Spouse: Katherine M. Stark
- Parent: Ronald E. Tuchman

Gary Tuchman (born October 2, 1960) is a retired American television reporter who worked for cable news channel CNN.

== Early life and education ==
Tuchman's father, Ronald E. Tuchman, was CEO of Child World, which was the 2nd largest toy store in the US at the time.

Tuchman was educated at Pascack Valley High School, a public high school in the borough of Hillsdale, New Jersey, from which he graduated in 1978, followed by Boston University, from which he gained a Bachelor of Science degree in broadcast journalism.

== Career ==
Before joining CNN in 1990, Tuchman worked for five years as an anchor and reporter at WPEC, a television station in West Palm Beach, Florida, where he specialized in political reporting.

He was a staff correspondent for CNN's primetime show Anderson Cooper 360°. Tuchman has also made regular appearances as a correspondent during CNN's New Year's Eve Live (which is co-hosted by Cooper), usually being assigned to smaller and more offbeat events alongside his daughter Lindsay. On April 24, 2025 Tuchman announced on a social media post on Instagram he was departing the network, retiring after 35 years with CNN and moved on.

== Personal life ==
In 1990, Tuchman married Katherine M. Stark in a Jewish ceremony at the Waldorf-Astoria in Manhattan, New York City, New York.

His daughter Lindsay is also a journalist. She began her career at WBOC-TV in Salisbury, Maryland, the same station where her father started.
