= Neville Bonner =

Australian politician (1922–1999)

Neville Bonner AO
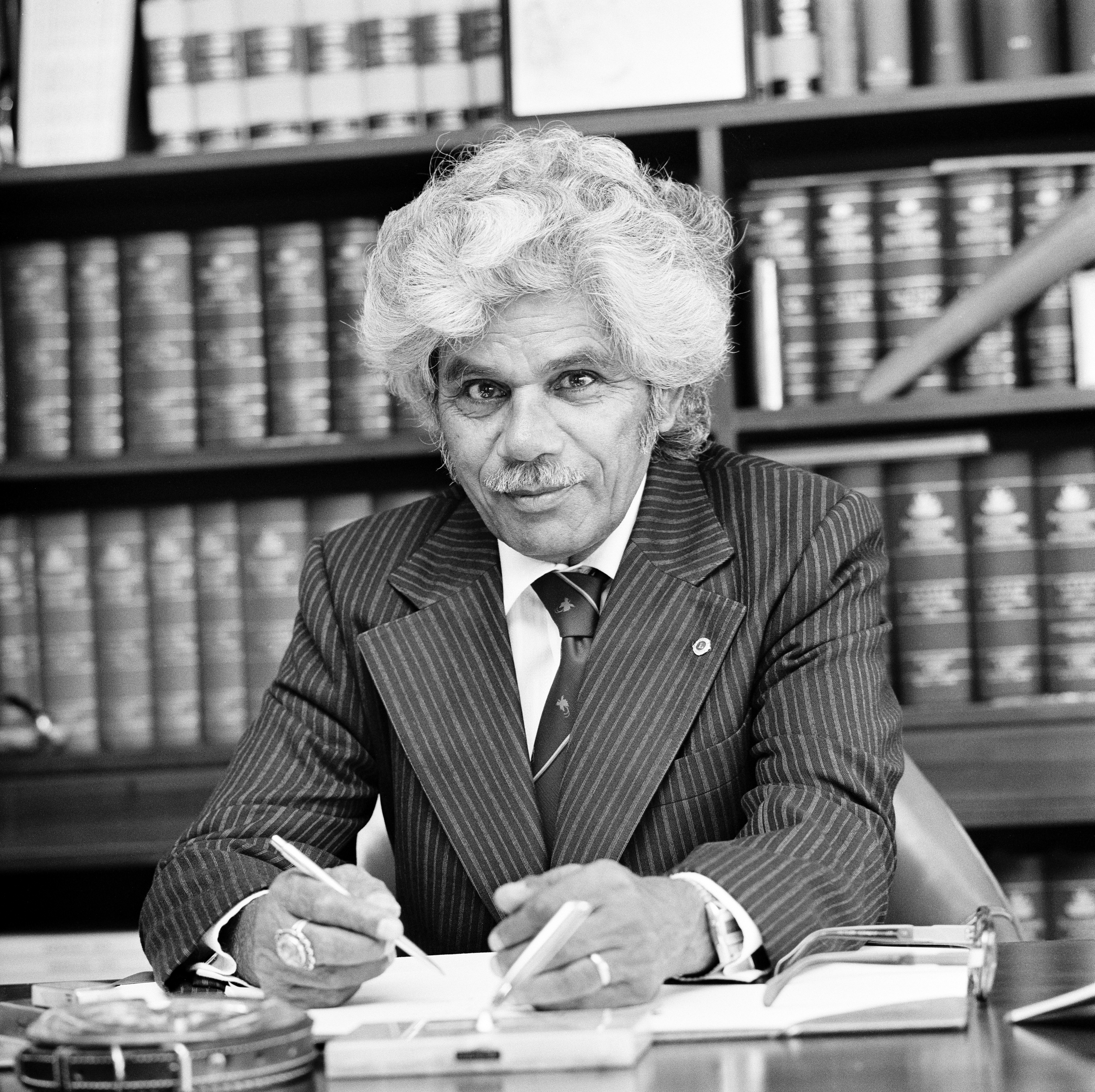
- Bonner in 1979

Senator for Queensland
- In office 11 June 1971 – 5 March 1983
- Preceded by: Dame Annabelle Rankin
- Succeeded by: Ron Boswell

Personal details
- Born: Neville Thomas Bonner; 28 March 1922 Ukerebagh Island, New South Wales, Australia
- Died: 5 February 1999 (aged 76) Ipswich, Queensland, Australia
- Party: Liberal (1967–1983); Independent (from 1983)
- Spouses: Mona Bonner (m. 1943; died 1969) Heather Ryan (m. 1972)
- Children: 5 boys
- Occupation: Federal senator

Neville Thomas Bonner (28 March 1922 – 5 February 1999) was an Australian politician, and the first Aboriginal Australian to become a member of the Parliament of Australia. He was appointed by the Queensland Parliament to fill a casual vacancy in the representation of Queensland in the Senate in 1971, and in 1972 became the first Indigenous Australian to be elected to the parliament by popular vote. Bonner was an elder of the Jagera people.

== Early life ==
Bonner was born on 28 March 1922 on Ukerebagh Island, a small island in the Tweed River of New South Wales close to the border with Queensland. He was the son of Julia Bell, an Indigenous Australian, and Henry Kenneth Bonner, an English immigrant. His maternal grandmother Ida Sandy was a member of the Ugarapul people of the Logan and Albert Rivers, while his maternal grandfather Roger Bell (or Jung Jung) was a fully initiated member of the Jagera people of the Brisbane River. According to Bonner, his grandfather was "sort of captured ... out of the tribe" as a young boy and given an English name.

Bonner's parents met and married in Murwillumbah, New South Wales. His father abandoned his mother when she was pregnant with him, leaving her destitute. She subsequently moved to the Aboriginal reserve on Ukerebagh Island, where she had another son. After about five years, the family moved near Lismore, New South Wales, to be closer to Bonner's grandparents, living on the banks of the Richmond River under a lantana bush. His mother subsequently had three children with Frank Randell, an Aboriginal man who was employed by the local police. One of his half-brothers died as a child and he "witnessed frequent acts of violence by Randell against his mother".

Bonner's mother died in July 1932, when he was ten years old, and his grandmother subsequently became his main caregiver. She moved the family to Beaudesert, Queensland, where in 1935 he completed his only year of formal education at Beaudesert State Rural School. His grandmother died in June 1935 and he moved back to New South Wales after finishing the school year. Bonner worked as a ring barker, cane cutter and stockman before settling on Palm Island, near Townsville in 1946, where he rose to the position of Assistant Settlement Overseer.

== Early activism and political involvement ==
While living in Ipswich, Queensland, Bonner joined the Coloured Welfare Council, which later merged into the One People of Australia League (OPAL). He was elected to OPAL's state committee in 1965 and served as president from 1968 to 1974. Bonner was considered a moderate within the Indigenous community, with OPAL having a reputation for cooperation with the Queensland state government. He publicly came into conflict with Aboriginal pastor Don Brady on a number of occasions regarding the government's policy on Palm Island, which Brady had described as a "police state" but Bonner said had put residents "head and shoulders in front of other Aborigines". In 1970 he criticised the Black Power movement as divisive and likely to provoke racial conflict.

Bonner joined the One Mile branch of the Liberal Party in 1967, having attended meetings for several years at the invitation of his future stepdaughter Robyn Kunde. He campaigned for the "Yes" vote on behalf of the Liberal Party at the 1967 referendum on Indigenous Australians. He had previously voted for the Australian Labor Party (ALP), but was "annoyed that Labor should presume the automatic support of Aboriginal people" after an incident where the local Labor MP Bill Hayden challenged his decision to hand out Liberal-branded how-to-vote cards. Bonner was chosen as a branch delegate in 1968 and was elected to the Queensland Liberals' state executive in 1969.

== Senator, 1971–1983 ==
=== Appointment and electoral record ===
In March 1970, Bonner won Liberal preselection as the party's second-ranked candidate in Queensland at the 1970 half-Senate election, behind incumbent senator Ian Wood. His candidacy was reported by The Canberra Times as "the first time that a major party has endorsed an Aboriginal candidate for the Senate". He was placed in third position on the joint ticket with the Country Party, losing to Vince Gair of the Democratic Labor Party for the final vacancy.

In 1971, Liberal senator Annabelle Rankin resigned and Bonner was chosen by the party as its candidate for the casual vacancy. He was formally appointed to fill the vacancy on 11 June 1971. He was the first Indigenous Australian to sit in federal parliament.

Bonner was re-elected to the remainder of Rankin's term at the 1972 federal election, in line with the constitutional provisions for casual vacancies at the time. He was re-elected to six-year terms at the 1974 and 1975 elections, both of which followed double dissolutions. He was elected to a further six-year term at the 1980 election as the Liberal Party's lead candidate in Queensland, although this was cut short by another double dissolution.

=== Tenure ===
During the Fraser government, Bonner served as chairman of the Senate Select Committee on Aborigines and Torres Strait Islanders in 1976 and as chairman of the Joint Select Committee on Aboriginal Land Rights in the Northern Territory from 1976 to 1977. He supported the Aboriginal Land Rights (Northern Territory) Act 1976 and in 1979 introduced government legislation to create the Aboriginal Development Commission, a responsibility usually held by government ministers. In 1982, the National Aboriginal Council called for Bonner to replace Ian Wilson as Minister for Aboriginal Affairs, with Bonner agreeing that the minister should be an Aboriginal person. However, he was "never seriously considered for a federal ministerial position". Fred Chaney believed that appointment as a minister would have interfered with his activism, while others believed that his lack of formal education and administrative experience counted against him.

Bonner regularly crossed the floor to vote against his party. According to a 2019 study, he crossed the floor on 34 occasions during his Senate term, the fourth-most of any member of parliament since 1950 behind only his Liberal colleagues Reg Wright, Ian Wood and Alan Missen.

The reaction to Bonner's election among the Indigenous community was mixed. He received death threats and on a visit to the Aboriginal Tent Embassy received "a steady stream of racial taunts from protestors during an outdoor interview". At the 1971 FCAATSI conference, Harold Blair denounced Bonner as a "black Judas" and stated "we do not regard him as a member of our race any longer". He received some support from Aboriginal university students who distributed how-to-vote cards urging voters to "put some colour in Canberra". In 1982, Bonner stated that he had "played the white man's game" and had to "consolidate myself within the party structure" to extend his time in parliament, allowing him to accomplish more as a result.

=== Independent candidacy and defeat ===
In February 1983, Fraser requested a double dissolution and called an early election. Bonner was relegated to the third position on the Liberals' Senate ticket behind fellow incumbent senators Kathy Martin and David MacGibbon. His re-election was widely regarded as unlikely and Fraser publicly expressed his disappointment at the outcome. Bonner attributed his demotion to his "stand on Aboriginal issues".

Bonner resigned from the Liberal Party on 11 February 1983 and announced he would recontest his seat as an independent. He rejected an invitation from Kath Walker to stand on a joint ticket. Bonner self-funded his campaign, driving around Queensland, and accordingly to The Canberra Times was "given more time on regional radio, television or newspapers than any other Independent, the Democrats, and, in many places, the Liberals". He was narrowly defeated by Democrats candidate Michael Macklin for the final vacancy in Queensland, polling 6.7 percent of the statewide vote.

== Political views ==
=== Aboriginal affairs ===
Bonner's primary interest in the Senate was Aboriginal affairs. In his maiden speech he emphasised the importance of education and "wished to see Aboriginal Australians retain their cultural identity, while acquiring the economic, educational and social opportunities that white Australians took for granted". In September 1974 he moved a motion in the Senate calling for Indigenous Australians to receive compensation for the dispossession of their land.

Bonner was critical of the Whitlam government's attempts to expand the role of the federal government in Indigenous affairs. In 1973 he criticised the newly created National Aboriginal Consultative Committee (NACC) for the low enrolment figures in its elections and said that the creation of the body was a form of apartheid that would "divide Aborigines not only among themselves but also from the rest of the Australian community". In the same year he opposed the government's attempts to move the Australian border with Papua New Guinea and presented a petition by Torres Strait Islanders requesting to remain Australian citizens. Bonner also criticised the Aboriginal and Torres Strait Islanders (Queensland Discriminatory Laws) Act 1975, which sought to override Queensland state laws, and said that if the government wanted to "go into Queensland and take control of Aborigines [...] they will do so over my dead body".

Bonner was initially supportive of the Queensland state government's policy on Aboriginal affairs, regarding their track record as superior to the federal government's record in the Northern Territory. However his relationship with Queensland premier Joh Bjelke-Petersen "gradually deteriorated", and in 1982 he said that Bjelke-Petersen had been a "dismal failure on Aboriginal affairs. In the same year he supported Aboriginal protests during the 1982 Commonwealth Games in Brisbane, although he unsuccessfully tried to prevent a march that had been deemed illegal.

=== East Timor ===
Bonner was a long-time supporter of the East Timorese independence movement. In September 1975, during the East Timorese civil war, he visited East Timor with Labor MPs Ken Fry and Arthur Gietzelt, where they met with Fretilin leaders including José Ramos-Horta. He subsequently criticised Gough Whitlam for the failure of the Australian government to provide humanitarian aid. Following the Indonesian invasion of East Timor in December 1975, Bonner told parliament that he had attempted to warn both Whitlam and Liberal shadow minister Andrew Peacock of the situation and that "all of us [...] should hang our heads in shame". In April 1977, he said that Fraser and Peacock had "blood on their hands" for their failure to support East Timor after the invasion. He subsequently crossed the floor to support a Senate inquiry into East Timor.

== Later life ==
Following Bonner's electoral defeat, incoming ALP prime minister Bob Hawke publicly promised him a government post. In June 1983 he was appointed to the board of the Australian Broadcasting Corporation (ABC). He briefly acted as ABC chairman in April 1984, and in June 1986 was reappointed to a further five-year term on the board, concluding in 1991.

Bonner was a member of the council of Griffith University Council from 1992 to 1996 and was awarded an honorary doctorate in 1993. In 1998 he was elected to the Constitutional Convention as a candidate of Australians for Constitutional Monarchy. He was made a life member of the Liberal Party in the same year.

In 1998, Bonner announced he had been diagnosed with terminal lung cancer. He died at a hospice in Ipswich on 5 February 1999, aged 76. He was granted a state funeral, held at St Stephen's Church, and interred at Warrill Park Lawn Cemetery.

== Honours and legacy ==
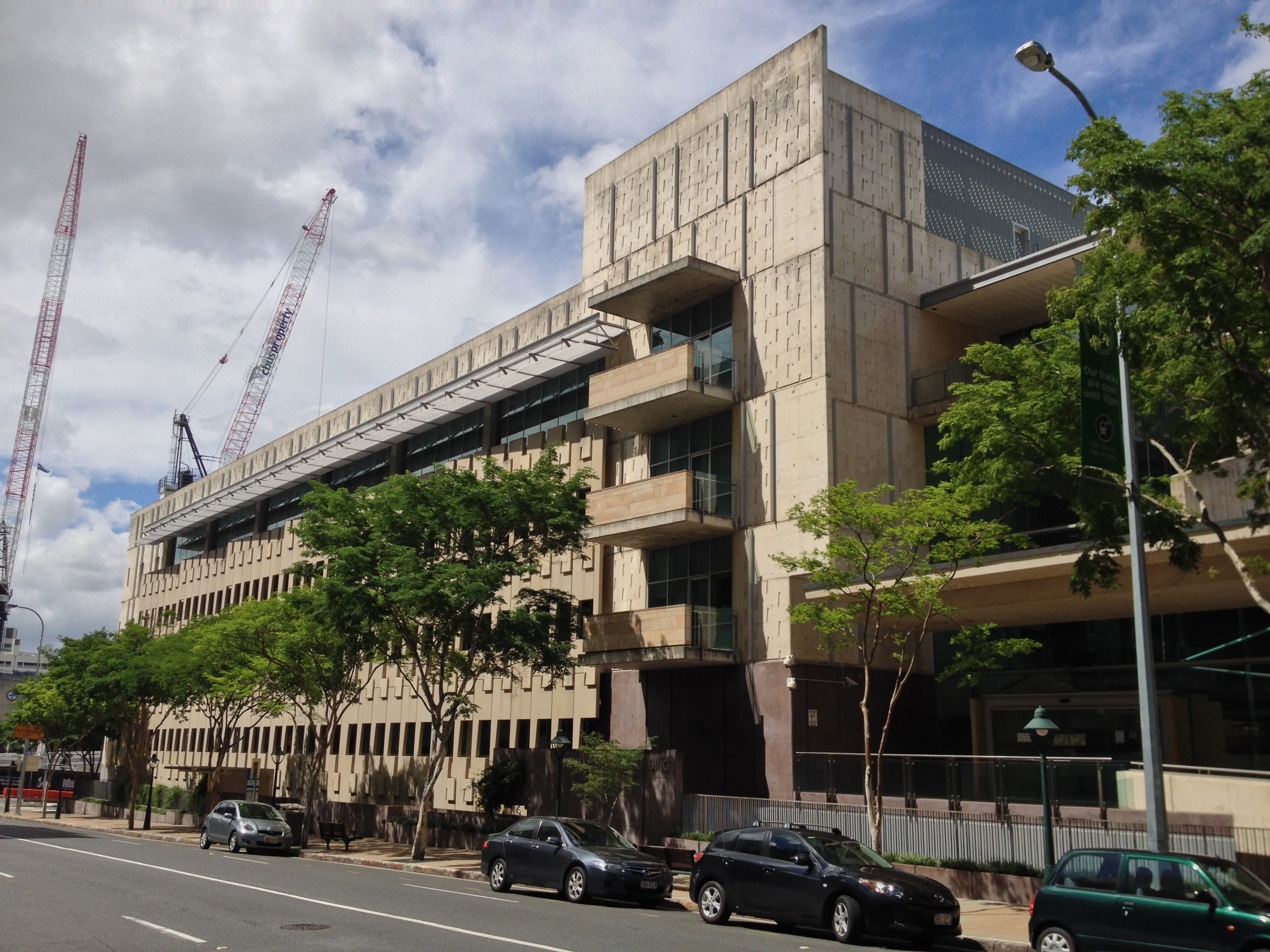
Neville Bonner Building, Brisbane (demolished 2017)

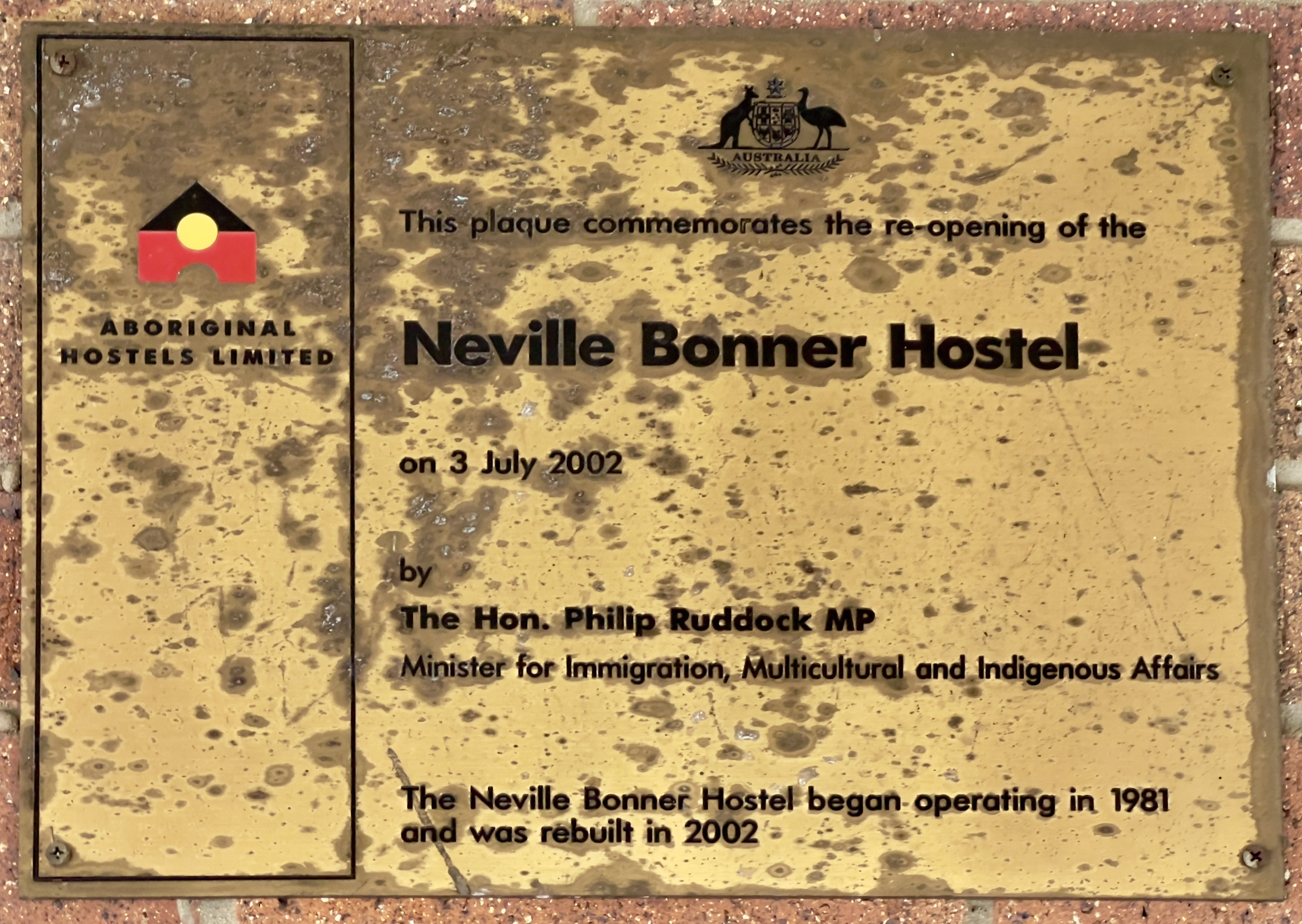
Plaque at the Neville Bonner Hostel, Rockhampton

In 1979, Bonner was jointly named Australian of the Year, along with naturalist Harry Butler. He was appointed an Officer of the Order of Australia (AO) in 1984.

The head office of the Queensland Department of Communities, Child Safety and Disability Services in Brisbane, built in 1999, was named the Neville Bonner Building. Despite having won two architectural awards (the RAIA Beatrice Hutton Award for Commercial Building 1999, a national award, and the RAIA (Queensland) F.D.G Stanley Award & Regional Commendation 1999), it was demolished in 2017 to make way for the Queen's Wharf development. The Neville Bonner Bridge, a footbridge built in 2023, and opened in August 2024, is part of the new development.

The Neville Bonner Memorial Scholarship was established by the federal government in 2000, a scholarship for Indigenous Australians to study Honours in political science or related subjects at any recognised Australian university.

In 2002, the Neville Bonner Award for Indigenous Education was introduced as part of the Australian Awards for University Teaching (AAUT), which were established by the federal government in 1997. The inaugural award was won jointly by Marcia Langton and Larissa Behrendt.

A multipurpose 47 bed hostel, managed by Aboriginal Hostels Limited, located in the Rockhampton suburb of Berserker, was redeveloped and reopened in July 2002 as the Neville Bonner Hostel.

The Queensland federal electorate of Bonner was created in 2004 and was named in his honour.

The suburb of Bonner in Canberra, created around 2008, bears his name.

In 2025, a statue was erected on the grounds of Old Parliament House that memorialises Bonner's boomerang-throwing demonstration.

== Personal life ==
Bonner married Mona Banfield in 1943, in a Catholic ceremony at Palm Island's mission. They had five sons and fostered three daughters, prior to Mona's death in 1969. Bonner remarried in 1972 to Heather Ryan (née Trotter), who had three adult children. His great-niece Joanna Lindgren was appointed to the Senate in 2015.

Bonner was taught to make boomerangs by his grandfather. In 1966, he established a boomerang manufacturing business named Bonnerang, with the assistance of his family. The boomerangs were handmade from the roots of black wattle trees, as Bonner refused to use synthetic materials. His company produced up to 450 boomerangs per week, but folded after a year due to a shortage of wood. After being elected to parliament, Bonner gave a boomerang demonstration in the gardens of Parliament House. In his maiden speech he called on the intellectual property of the boomerang to be reserved for Indigenous people, as non-Indigenous people were producing cheap synthetic properties. One of his boomerangs is held by the Museum of Australian Democracy.

== See also ==
- List of Indigenous Australian politicians
