= Joseph Kay =

Joseph Kay or Joseph Kaye may refer to:

- Joseph Kay (architect) (1775–1847), English architect
- Joseph Kay (economist), English economist
- Joseph Kay (writer) Canadian television writer and producer
- Joseph Kaye (cricketer), English cricketer
- Sir Joseph Kaye, 1st Baronet (1856–1923) of the Kaye baronets
