= Khay =

Khay or KHAY may refer to:

- Khay (village), a non-residential rural locality in Achkhoy-Martanovsky District, Republic of Chechnya, Russia
- Khay (vizier), Vizier of Ramesses II
- Khay (Nubian official), Egyptian official under king Tutankhamun
- KHAY, a radio station in California
- "Hi" (Ofra Haza song) or "Khay", the Israeli entry in the Eurovision Song Contest 1983
