= Robert Kay =

Robert Kay may refer to:

- Robert Kay (footballer), English footballer
- Robert Kay (inventor) (1728–1802), English inventor of a device to improve weaving on looms
- Robert Kay (librarian) (1825–1904), director of South Australian Library, Museum and Art Gallery
- Robert Kay (politician) (1869–1947), English solicitor and politician
- Robert E. Kay (1916–1990), Republican senator from New Jersey
