= Ukerebagh Island =

Island in New South Wales, Australia

Ukerabagh Island
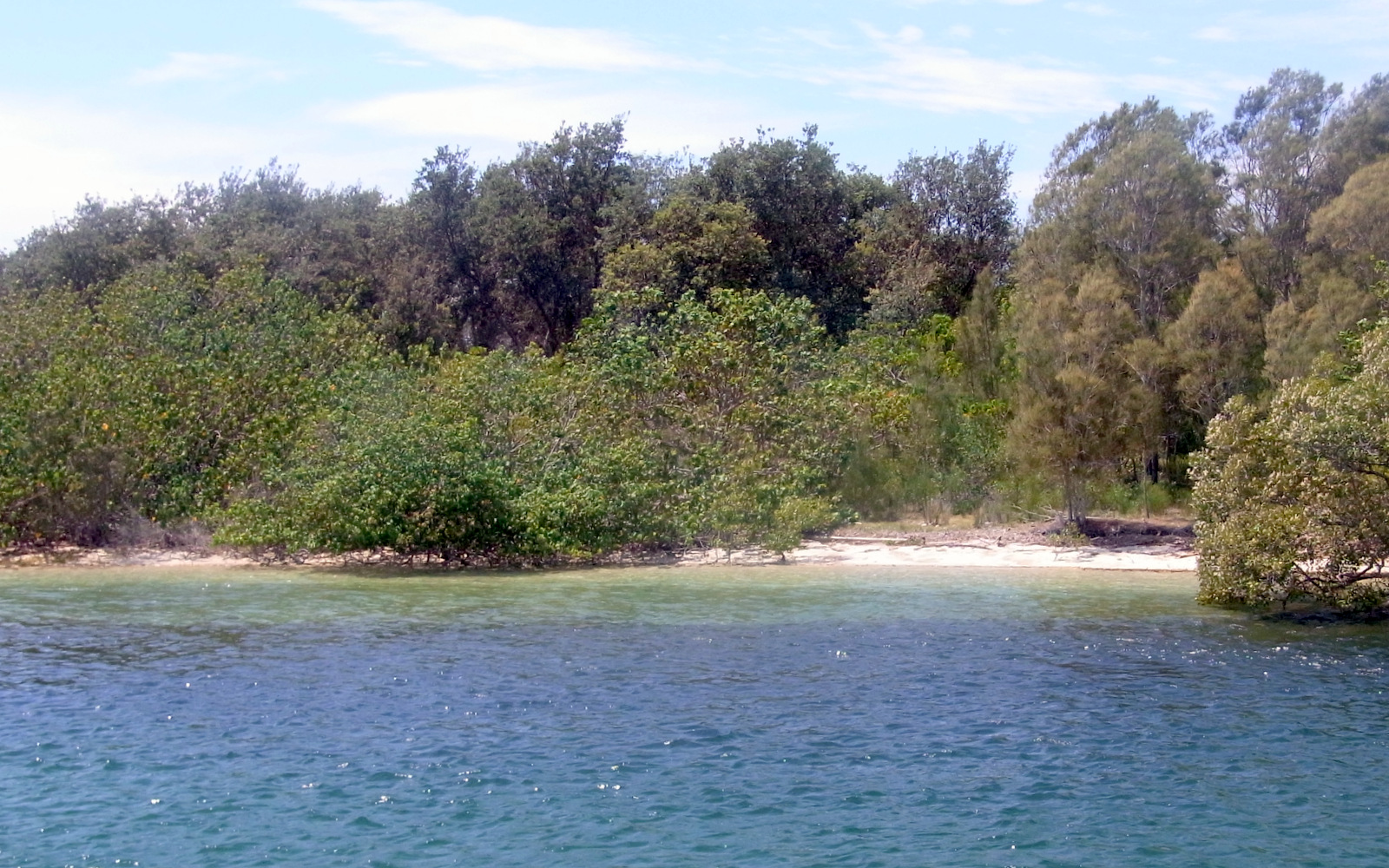
- Ukerebagh Island, located in the Tweed River
- Interactive map of Ukerabagh Island

Geography
- Location: Tweed River
- Highest elevation: 20 m (70 ft)

Administration
- Australia
- State: New South Wales

Ukerabagh Island Nature Reserve
- IUCN category Ia (strict nature reserve)
- Location within New South Wales
- Location: New South Wales
- Nearest city: Tweed Heads
- Coordinates: 28°11′25″S 153°32′54″E
- Area: 1.25 km^{2} (0.48 sq mi)
- Established: 1983
- Governing body: NSW National Parks & Wildlife Service
- Website: Official website

The Ukerabagh Island is a river island in the Ukerabagh Island Nature Reserve, a protected nature reserve. It is located in the mouth of the Tweed River, in the Northern Rivers region of New South Wales in eastern Australia. The 125-hectare (310-acre) reserve is situated near Tweed Heads and 1 kilometre (0.62 mi) south of a section that defines the border between the states of New South Wales and Queensland. The island and reserve is an important site for coastal birds.

== Indigenous Australians ==
Ukerebagh was declared an Aboriginal reserve in 1927. It was gazetted as "reserved from sale for future public requirements" in 1951. Many Indigenous families were sent to Ukerebagh in the 1920s and 1930s with the intent of segregating them from the general population. They were "reliant on government rations, but supplemented their diet with fish, oysters, mud-crab, pippies, wallabies, lizards and birds".

The island remains a significant area to the local indigenous Australians. The Minjungbal people were the first people to live in the district, they spoke the Minjungbal language, a dialect of the Bundjalung. Senator Neville Bonner, the first indigenous Australian member of parliament was born under a palm tree on the island in 1922. Though the settlement was abandoned in the 1960s, Aboriginal people still visit the island regularly.

== Vegetation ==
The island is surrounded by mangroves. There are four mangrove species in the far north east of New South Wales. Other common plants on the island include David's Heart and the Coast Hibiscus. A small patch of littoral rainforest occurs on the island.

== See also ==
- List of islands of New South Wales
- Protected areas of New South Wales
