= John Zarrella =

American news correspondent

- Education: St. Thomas University
- Occupation: News correspondent
- Years active: 1981–Present.

John Zarrella is an American news correspondent and the founder of JZ Media, a boutique consulting firm specializing in news production, media training, video production, voice-over services, and event hosting. A veteran journalist, Zarrella built a distinguished career spanning more than four decades, including 32 years with CNN, where he became one of the network’s most recognizable correspondents.

Zarrella joined CNN in 1981 as an executive producer at the network’s Atlanta headquarters, later becoming the Miami correspondent in 1983. From that post, he covered stories across Florida, the Caribbean, Central and South America, and beyond. He became best known as CNN’s principal correspondent for U.S. space program coverage, reporting on landmark events such as John Glenn’s return to space in 1998, the Mars Pathfinder mission, and dozens of Space Shuttle launches. He was on site during the 1986 Challenger disaster and covered the final flights of the Space Shuttle program in 2011.

Beyond space, Zarrella reported on numerous major world events, including the 2010 Gulf Oil Spill, which earned a Peabody Award; the 2011 coup in Honduras; the Air France crash in Brazil; the Elian Gonzalez case; the trial of Manuel Noriega; the Oklahoma City bombing; and the Mexico City earthquake.

After leaving CNN, Zarrella launched JZ Media and continued his work as a correspondent and consultant. Since 2014, he has contributed reports for a range of national and international clients. He frequently emcees high-profile events at Kennedy Space Center, including Apollo mission anniversaries, Astronaut Hall of Fame inductions, and the Space Shuttle Atlantis exhibit opening.

Zarrella holds a bachelor’s degree in English from St. Thomas University, formerly Biscayne College; where he helped establish the school’s journalism program.

== External links and references ==
- John Zarrella at CNN
- John Zarrella's website on web.archive.org
- JZ Media on Florida's Sunbiz website
- John Zarrella's Instagram
