= Michael Kay =

Michael Kay may refer to:

- Michael Kay (sports broadcaster) (born 1961), American sports announcer and broadcaster
- Michael Howard Kay (born 1951), British XML developer
- Michael Kay (professor) (1927–2014), American historian
- Michael Kay (footballer) (born 1989), English footballer
- Michael Kay (cricketer) (born 1981), former English cricketer
- Michael Kay (songwriter), English singer, songwriter and record producer

== See also ==
- Michael Kaye (1927–2014), English first-class cricketer and British Army officer
- Michael Kayode (born 2004), Italian professional footballer
