= Kaye Coppoolse =

Dutch retired footballer

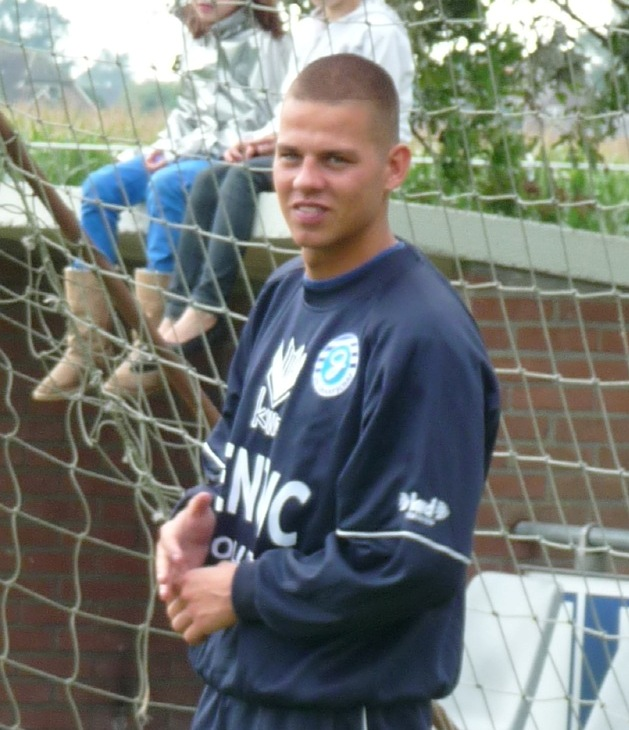

Personal information
- Date of birth: 3 January 1991 (age 35)
- Height: 1.80 m (5 ft 11 in)
- Position: Striker

Senior career*
Years	Team	Apps	(Gls)
2009–2012	De Graafschap	3	(0)
2012	→ Veendam (loan)	11	(0)
2012–2013	WKE		
2013–2014	Babberich		
- * Club domestic league appearances and goals as of 18:55, 8 February 2012 (UTC)

Kaye Coppoolse (born 3 January 1991) is a Dutch retired footballer who played as a striker.

== Club career ==
Coppoolse came through the De Graafschap youth system and made his professional debut for their senior squad on 18 December 2010 against SC Heerenveen. He later played on loan for Veendam before moving into amateur football with WKE, Babberich, VIOD and AFC Arnhem.

== Tattoo artist ==
Coppoolse runs his own tattoo shop in Drempt.
