= St Stephen's Church, Ipswich =

St Stephen's Church
- Central Presbyterian Church, Ipswich
- Central Church
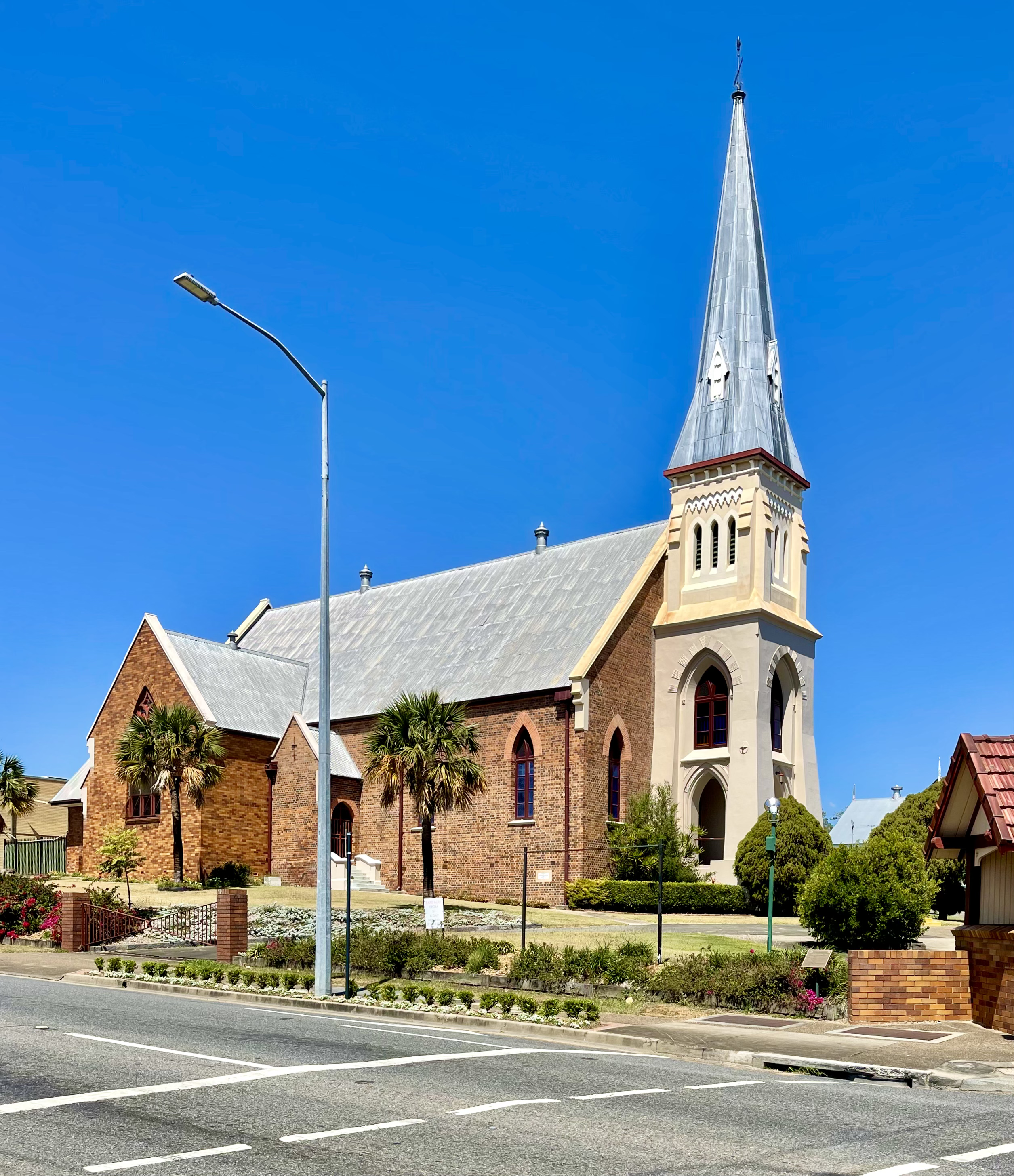
- St Stephen's Church, 2021
- St Stephen's Church
- 27°36′59″S 152°45′46″E
- Address: 22 Limestone Street, Ipswich, City of Ipswich, Queensland
- Country: Australia
- Denomination: Presbyterian
- Website: www.centralchurch.net.au

History
- Founded: August 1865
- Founder: Hon. Arthur Macaliste
- Dedication: Saint Stephen

Architecture
- Architects: Joseph Backhouse (1865); George Gill (1911–1912)
- Architectural type: Church
- Style: Gothic Revival
- Years built: 1865–1978

Administration
- Division: Queensland
- Parish: Central Church

Queensland Heritage Register
- Official name: St Stephen's Church & Hall
- Type: State heritage (built)
- Designated: 21 October 1992
- Reference no.: 600580
- Significant period: 1865, 1888–1889, 1911–1912, 1958, 1978 (fabric)
- Significant components: Pipe organ, trees/plantings, tower – bell / belfry, furniture/fittings, lychgate, stained glass window/s, hall, gallery, church

St Stephen's Church and Hall, part of the Central Church parish and officially Central Presbyterian Church, Ipswich, is a heritage-listed Presbyterian church and associated churchyard at 22 Limestone Street, Ipswich, City of Ipswich, Queensland, Australia. The church was designed by Joseph Backhouse, built from 1865 to 1978, and added to the Queensland Heritage Register on 21 October 1992.

== History ==
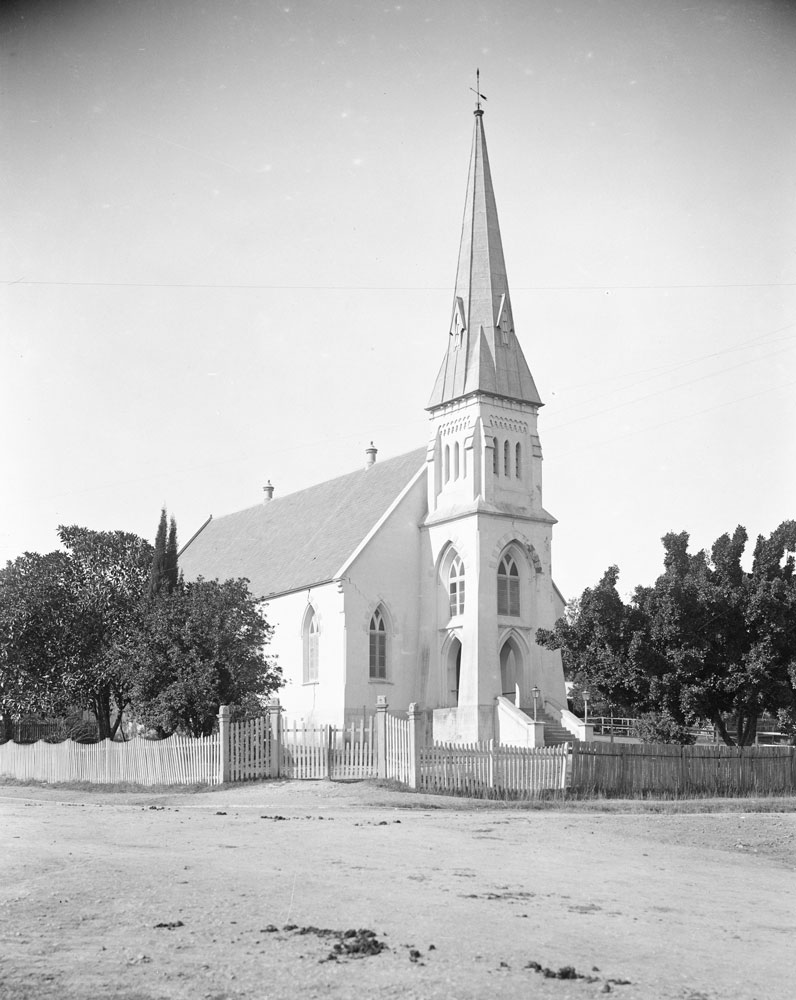
St Stephen's Church, Ipswich, circa 1910

St Stephen's Presbyterian Church stands as the second church constructed on the current site in 1864–1865. This striking Gothic Revival style brick church was designed by architect Joseph Backhouse and continues to be the place of worship for one the oldest congregations in Ipswich.

=== First church building ===
The first Presbyterian church service held in Ipswich was by Dr. John Dunmore Lang in December 1844. On 19 October 1851 the Reverend Walter Ross McLeod, of the United Presbyterian Church of South Brisbane, preached to a congregation of 150 people, the largest of any church congregation to that date in Ipswich. Following the induction of the Rev. William Lambie Nelson as minister for Ipswich on 30 August 1853, the congregation began to work towards a permanent worship place for the "Scots Church of Ipswich". By early November 1855 a church, 40 by 26 feet (12.2 by 7.9 m) and with a square tower, had been completed according to the plans and specifications drawn out by John Petrie.

The official grant of the land on which the church stood, at the corner of Limestone and Gordon Streets, was not made by the New South Wales Government until 30 December 1858. On 22 February 1859 there were two further grants of adjacent land, for a school house and manse, bringing the total to one acre. (The separation of Queensland as an independent colony did not occur until December 1859.)

Prominent members of the Established Church of Scotland at that time were Arthur Macalister, later Premier of Queensland, John Pettigrew, William Hendren, William Craies and Hugh Nelson (later Sir Hugh). The church took on the name of St Stephen's in 1862. This early church proved to have faulty foundations, and had to be replaced.

=== Second church building ===
The present St Stephen's church was erected during the time of the Reverend Samuel Wilson, who arrived in 1863, also the year that the twelve independent Presbyterian Church of Scotland congregations united into the one Presbyterian Church of Queensland, with the Rev. Wilson being appointed the first moderator of the united church.

The foundation stone for the new church was laid by the Hon Arthur Macalister in August 1865. The architect for the new building was Joseph Backhouse, brother of Benjamin Backhouse who designed Ipswich Grammar School. It has been suggested that Joseph Backhouse only supervised the construction of the church under designs made by his brother Benjamin, however this not substantiated. Joseph Backhouse was an architect in Ipswich in 1864–65, and was the town surveyor for the Ipswich Municipal Council in 1865–67. Contractors were Farley, Renny and McHugh.

In 1911–12 the church was virtually rebuilt owing to foundation problems which meant that the walls had to be replaced. The steeple and sessions house were retained in original condition, the roof raised, and two porticos were added at that time. The architect was George Brockwell Gill, and the contractor John Whitehead. The foundations still had problems, and in 1958 the church underpinnings were shored up by planting six metre pyramids of concrete under the building. The transepts were included at that time. However, the sessions house was not underpinned in 1958. In 1978 the sessions house was dismantled brick by brick and a new sessions house, incorporating a kitchen and new offices, was erected in the same place adjacent to, but not structurally adjoining, the existing building. A number of the stained glass windows depict the development of the Presbyterian Church and one came from the original St Andrew's Church in Wickham Terrace, Brisbane.

In 2008, the name of the church was changed to Central Presbyterian Church, Ipswich, and is commonly known as Central Church, Ipswich.

=== Manse ===
The foundation stone for the church manse was laid on 12 August 1879, and the building opened in January 1880. The manse was located to the east of the church and it was recently relocated to an acreage property at Anstead. The church still owns the land where the manse had stood and a modern shop building now stands on the land with the rear of the building being used as a worship centre.

=== Church hall ===
Tenders for the erection of a Sabbath School, or Hall, were called for in 1888 on an allotment of land south of the church granted by James Ivory. The Sabbath School was constructed by builders Robert Wilson & Co for £751 10s 6d and was opened in 1889.

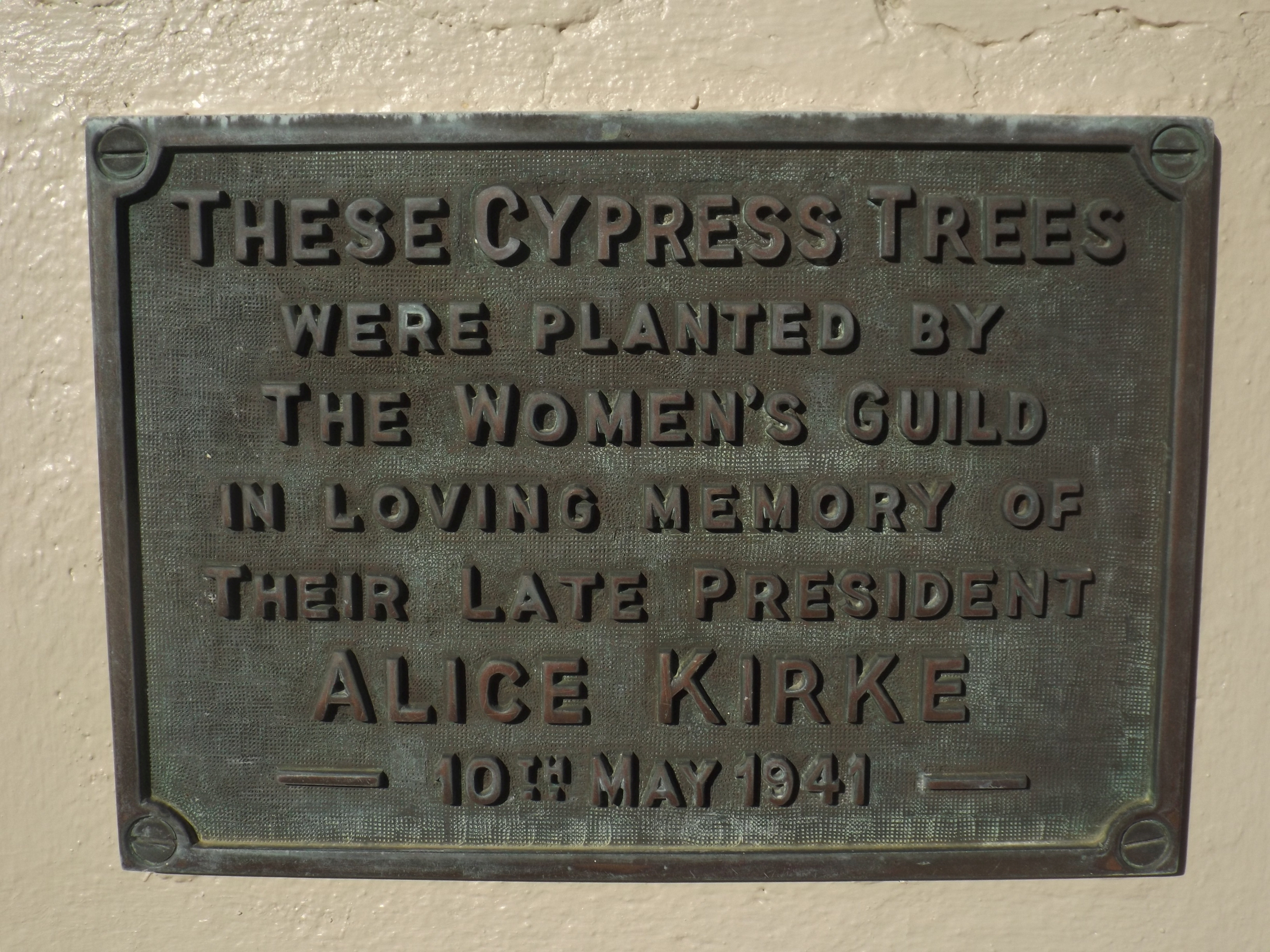
Women's Guild Plaque to Alice Kirke

The Women's Guild planted cypress trees at the front entry to the church in May 1941 in memory of their late president, Alice Kirke. A lych gate was erected on the north-eastern alignment in 1958 as a war memorial. In 1977, when several Protestant churches united, St. Stephen's was one of the congregations which continued as a Presbyterian Church, and its present parish, which extends from Gatton to Goodna, is essentially the original parish of 140 years ago.

== Description ==
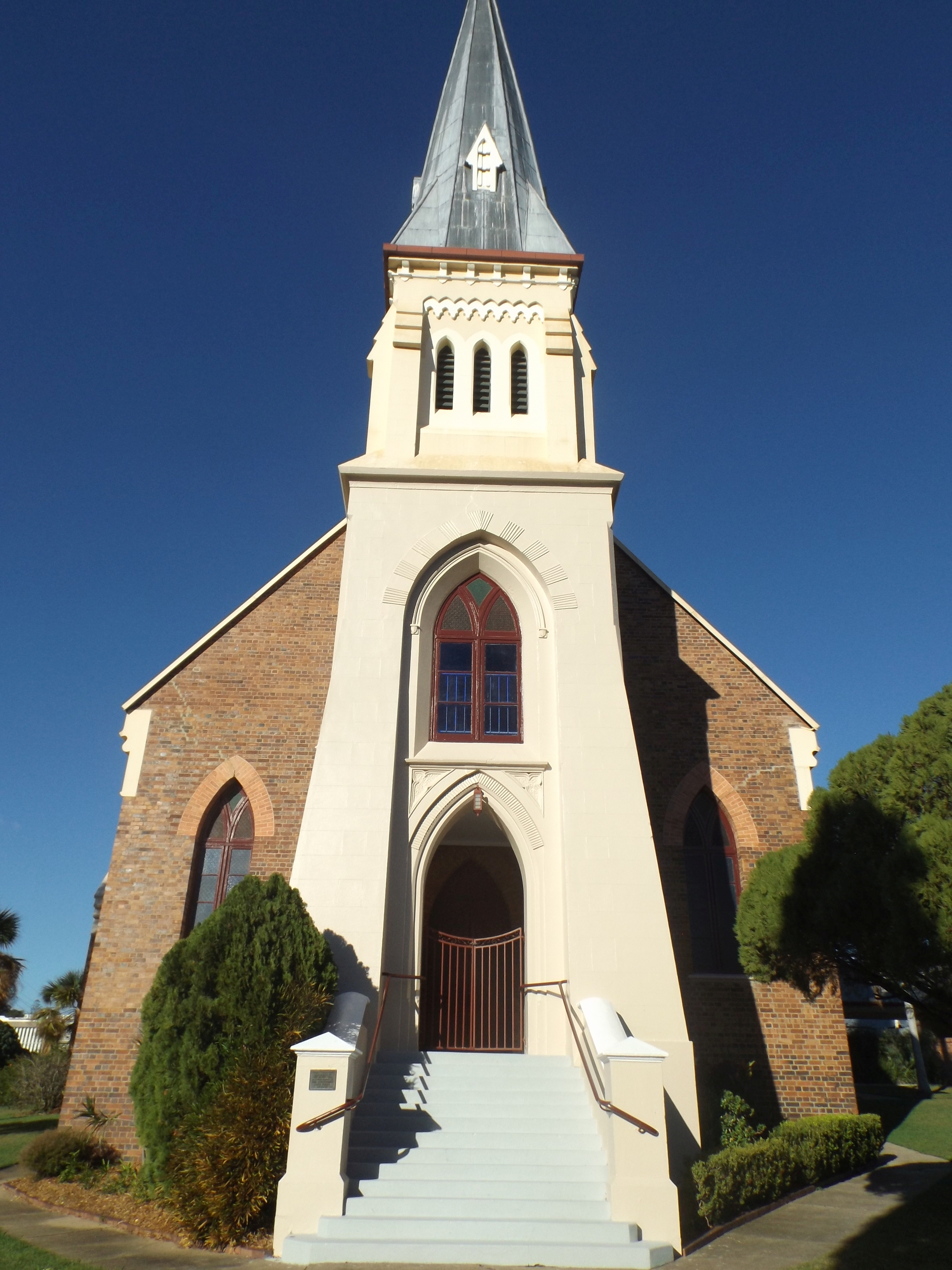
Front entrance, 2016

The church's western spire makes it a landmark within the city's townscape and the most dominant element of its immediate streetscape. The spire's presence is further accented by it being painted cream, while the remainder of the structure, including the sympathetic addition of a sessions house at the eastern end, is dark brick. The building has a Latin cross plan, and a corrugated iron roof, with ventilation to its ridges. Its detailing, in keeping with the tall spire, is derived from the Gothic Revival style. Its windows and door openings have pointed heads. Detailing to the spire includes: recessed pointed head arches, accented by tracery; voussoirs, alternately projecting; and elaborate moulding. A lighter coloured brick articulates the pointed heads of the church's other window and door openings.

Internally the church still contains most of its original fittings and furnishings including timber bench pews and decorative timber entrance screen. An original gallery overlooks the main floor of the church at the western end of the building and has access to the bell tower in the steeple.

An operational pipe organ sits in a pit on the southern side of the altar platform with the pipes and other mechanisms stored in the upper level of the southern transept. There is a chancellery situated in the northern transept.

A false rear wall has been constructed dividing the main church from the sessions house by a narrow hallway. The church and the sessions display several large cracks in the brick work due to shifting foundations and the floor in the sessions house is a "floating floor" which is sinking.

The timber hall, separated from the church by a carpark, has a cross- shaped plan, and a gabled portico entry with double access stairs. The hall has a corrugated iron roof with large decorative ventilators, and tall bargeboards. Fine timber-work is used within the upper panel of each tall, narrow window to suggest the tracery of a pointed head arch. Although the hall is built of timber, its detailing is consistent with the Gothic references made in the adjacent church most evident on the gabled front entrance and the timber valances which encircle the building.

Internally the hall still displays its original design clearly with a platform stage at the eastern end of the building looking out over a simple rectangular hall with a curved timber ceiling. An extension has been added at the rear of the building which include the church offices on the northern side.

The lych gate, included in this precinct is at the corner of Gordon and Limestone Streets. It has a brick base and a tiled, gable ended roof.

The plantings include two tall thin pines, mimicking the spire. The squat cypress tree plantings appropriately allow the built structure to dominate the site.

== Heritage listing ==
St Stephen's Church and Hall was listed on the Queensland Heritage Register on 21 October 1992 having satisfied the following criteria.

The place is important in demonstrating the evolution or pattern of Queensland's history.

St Stephen's Presbyterian Church and Hall are important in demonstrating the pattern of Queensland's history as the buildings are a manifestation of the establishment of the Presbyterian Church in Queensland and the substantial and striking design of the buildings are a reflection of the importance of the Church in nineteenth-century communities.

The place demonstrates rare, uncommon or endangered aspects of Queensland's cultural heritage.

The grounds of St Stephen's Presbyterian Church contain a lych gate on the north-eastern corner constructed in 1958 as a war memorial, an uncommon type of war memorial in Queensland.

The place is important in demonstrating the principal characteristics of a particular class of cultural places.

St Stephen's Church is important in demonstrating the principal characteristics of a nineteenth-century gothic style brick church including the steeple and the pointed arched window and door frames.

The place is important because of its aesthetic significance.

The Church has high aesthetic significance as a city landmark which has an important townscape contribution. The hall is also aesthetically significant for its fine timber detailing and together the church and hall create a cohesive composition of religious buildings dominating the corner of Limestone and Thorn Streets.

The place has a strong or special association with a particular community or cultural group for social, cultural or spiritual reasons.

St Stephen's Church and Hall have a strong and special association with its congregation, one of the oldest congregations in Ipswich, as a place of worship and gathering since the 1860s.

The place has a special association with the life or work of a particular person, group or organisation of importance in Queensland's history.

The church has special association with architect Joseph Backhouse (brother of Benjamin Backhouse) as his major work in Ipswich.
