= Richard Kay =

Richard Kay may refer to:

- Richard Kay (actor) (1937–1985), English actor who appeared in Juliet Bravo
- Richard Kay (anthropologist) (born 1947), professor at Duke University, United States
- Richard Kay (producer) (fl. 1949–1985), producer of The Golden Mistress and other films

== See also ==
- Sir Richard Kaye, 6th Baronet, English peer, churchman and scientist
