= Joseph Kaye (cricketer) =

English cricketer

Joseph Lowther Kaye (21 June 1846 – 12 October 1882) was an English cricketer. He was a right-handed batsman and a right-arm fast bowler who played for Lancashire. He was born in Honley, Holmfirth, Yorkshire and died in Kirkham, Lancashire.

Kaye played club cricket for East Lancashire from their first year of 1864, and at Fairfield in Liverpool from 1866. He was selected to play his first and only first-class game in September 1867, when Lancashire were struggling to put together a team to play against Yorkshire, fielding five new players.

This was Kaye's sole first-class appearance for the side.
