= Lori Kay =

American sculptor

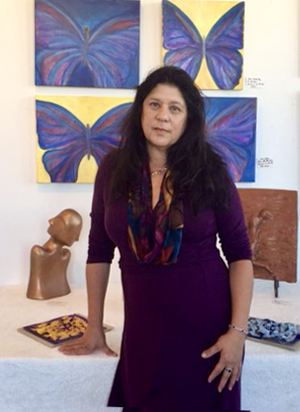
- Lori Kay in her Hunter's Point Shipyard studio, San Francisco, California, USA
- Born: May 1, 1962 (age 64); San Diego, California
- Known for: Sculpture, Public Art

Lori Kay (born May 1, 1962) also known as Lori Kay Stout, is an American artist, educator and activist based in the San Francisco Bay Area. She is known for her sculptures made of bronze, mixed media and recycled materials. Her work sometimes addresses issues of racial identity or mixed racial identity or issues of environmental awareness. She is also the owner of the Lupin Lodge of Los Gatos, a clothing-optional resort.

== Career ==
Kay was born May 1, 1962, in San Diego, California, to a Filipino father and a Euro-American mother. Some of her work addresses her childhood and racial identity.

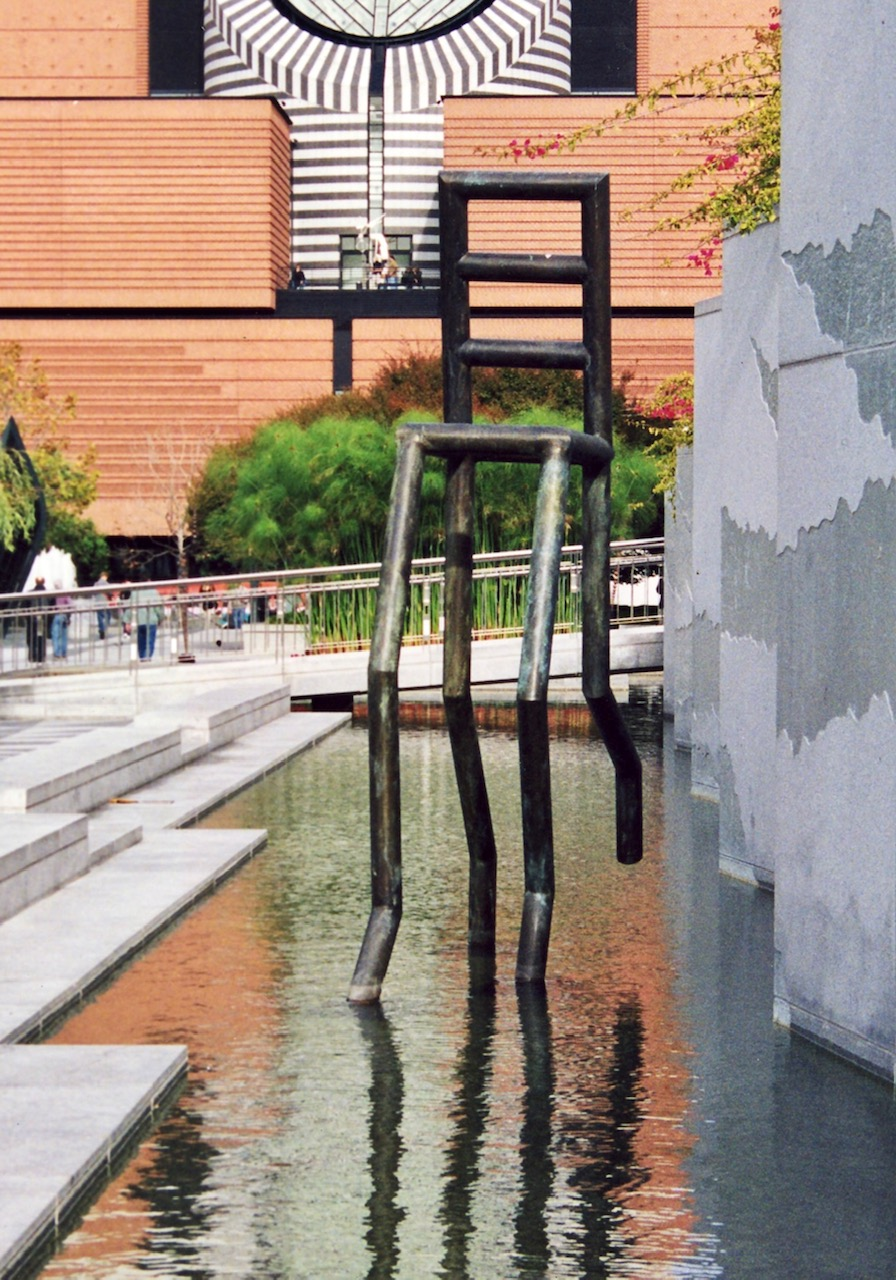
Running Chair exhibited at Yerba Buena Garden, San Francisco, California

In 1986, she received a B.A. in Art and Art History from the University of California, Santa Cruz with additional studies at the University of Geneva in 1984 and the Muttenz Gymnasium in Basel in 1980–81. She then spent a year in a foundry and a marble studio of Pietrasanta, Italy. After working on both large-scale and pedestal-sized pieces, her experience culminated with her first professional exhibit in Italy. After returning home, she apprenticed to a foundry master in San Jose, California.

From 1990 until 1999, Kay taught art classes with ArtsEdConnect through Arts Council Silicon Valley. From October 2003 until January 2004 she served as an artist in residency at San Francisco Recology.

Kay's public art has been exhibited in San Francisco ("Running Chair", Norcal Sculpture Park and "Broken Wishbone", San Francisco State University), Seattle (Harborview Hospital), Fremont ("Flight IV (dog)", Fremont Fire Station No. 5), Half Moon Bay ("Broken Wishbone", Pilarcito City Park), Mountain View ("Broken Wishbone", Mountain View Center for Performing Arts Plaza), Los Gatos ("Broken Wishbone", Lupine Lodge) and Bellevue, WA.

She was married to Glyn Stout until his death in 2015.

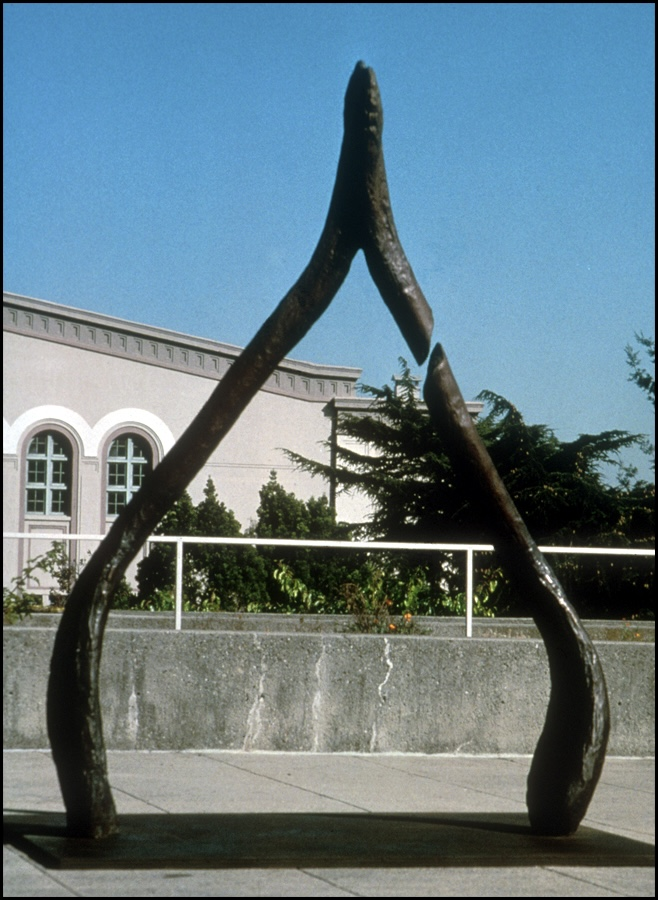
Broken Wishbone exhibited at Oakland Museum of California
