= Norman Kay =

Norman Kay may refer to:

- Norman Kay (bridge) (1927–2002), American bridge player
- Norman Kay (composer) (1929–2001), British composer
- Norman Kaye (1927–2007), Australian actor and musician
