= Mary Kay (landscape photographer) =

Greek landscape photographer

- Born: Maria Kaimaki; Greece
- Known for: Photography

Mary Kay (born Maria Kaimaki) is a Greek landscape photographer. She was the 2011 Digital Camera World Photographer of the Year for the Gardens and Plants category with her work Autumn Interlude.
