= Randi Kaye =

American television news journalist

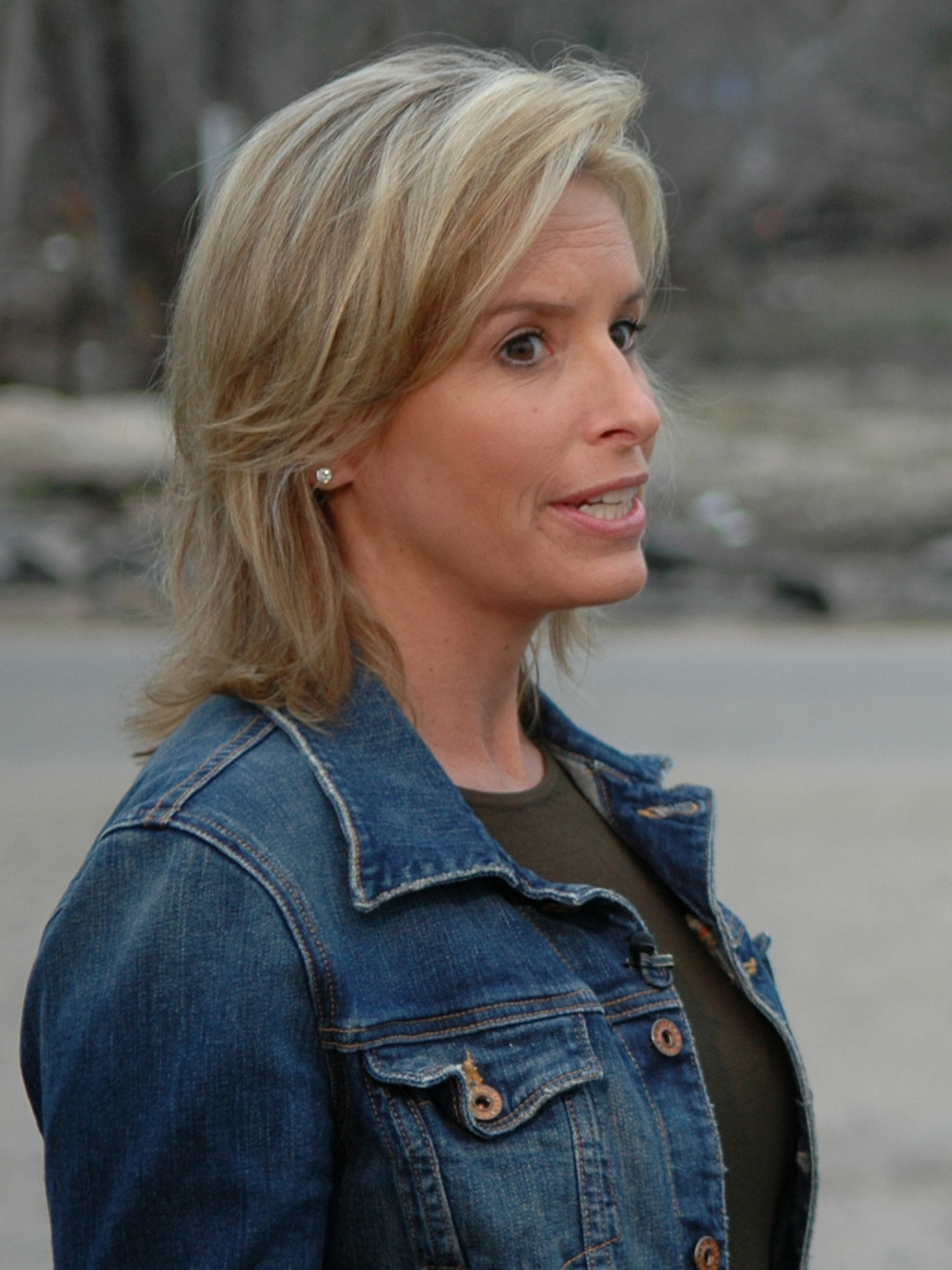
- Kaye in 2006
- Born: November 19, 1967 (age 58); New York City, New York, U.S.
- Education: Boston University
- Occupation: Investigative reporter
- Years active: 1989–present
- Spouse: Ross Holland
- Parent(s): Joyce Taffer Kaye; Gilbert D. Kaye

Randi Kaye (born November 19, 1967) is an American television news journalist working for CNN. She is based in New York and serves as an investigative reporter for Anderson Cooper 360°.

== Early life and career ==
Kaye is the daughter of Joyce (née Taffer) and Gilbert D. Kaye. She graduated cum laude from Boston University in 1989 with a degree in broadcast journalism. While an undergrad there, she joined the sorority Alpha Epsilon Phi.

She began her television career at ABC, working for Nightline and then Peter Jennings.

She moved to KATV in Little Rock, Arkansas. Kaye also worked for WFAA-TV in Dallas as a reporter and anchor; KMSP-TV in the Twin Cities, where she hosted Everyday Living; WWOR-TV in New York/New Jersey; and WCCO-TV in the Twin Cities as anchor of the 5pm and 10pm newscasts.

== CNN ==
Kaye joined CNN in December 2004. In addition to being a national correspondent, she is an investigative reporter for Anderson Cooper 360°. She previously anchored the 1:00–2:00 pm ET weekday slot on CNN Newsroom. After several changes at the network and the departure of previous weekend mornings anchor T. J. Holmes, she took over as permanent weekend anchor. In April 2013, Kaye left CNN Newsroom and returned to her role at AC360°.

== Criticism from Donald Trump ==
Kaye received criticism from Donald Trump and some of his supporters for what they claimed was bias in the manner in which she reported a campaign event held by Trump in South Carolina during the 2016 Presidential election primary campaign. In her report that aired on CNN on September 23, 2015, Kaye pointed out that more than half of the seats were not filled in the event and that Trump only emphasized polls favoring him rather than polls that disfavored him. The Washington Post fact checked Kaye's reporting, and citing pictures of empty seats, found it to be correct.

== Awards ==
Kaye won an Emmy for Outstanding Coverage of a Current Business News Story for her reporting on black market infertility in 2006. The story, which was broadcast on Anderson Cooper 360°, reported infertile couples choosing risky and sometimes illegal ways to have children because of the soaring cost of in-vitro medications.

== Personal life ==
She is married to Ross Holland. Her father died by suicide in 2002 and she spoke about his death publicly with Anderson Cooper, detailing her struggles and to promote suicide awareness.
