= George Frederick Kay =

American geologist

George Frederick Kay (14 September 1873 – 19 July 1943) was an American geologist who worked at the University of Iowa. He introduced the term "Gumbotil" for Pleistocene origin clays. A major contribution was his Pleistocene Geology of Iowa. He established that the period lasted for at least a million years.

Kay was born on a farm in Virginia, Ontario, the fifth child of Elizabeth Marshall Rae and Joseph Sidney Kay who were settlers of Scottish and Irish origin. He studied at the Owen Sound Collegiate Institute before going to the University of Toronto. He received a BA (1900) and an MS (1902) and worked at a school in Zephyr, Ontario before going to the University of Chicago where he worked on his doctorate (1914) under Joseph Iddings. He then worked for the US Geological Survey, across the US. The early work was on mapping mineral deposits. He joined the University of Kansas in 1904 and three years later moved to the University of Iowa where he worked until 1943 serving as a Dean of the college of liberal arts (from 1917 until retirement) but continued to teach. Kay also gave public lectures on geology at the Presbyterian Church. He introduced the term "gumbotil" (the word gumbo had already been in casual use among geologists) to describe heavy dark clays formed from Pleistocene glaciation. He used the thickness of the gumbotil layers to estimate glacial and interglacial periods.

Kay married schoolmate Bethea Hopper in 1902 and they had two sons (George who became a geologist and Galvin who served in the Army Medical Corps in India) and a daughter Marjorie McLaughlin (d. 1936). He died of cancer.
