= Josh Campbell (journalist) =

American television correspondent

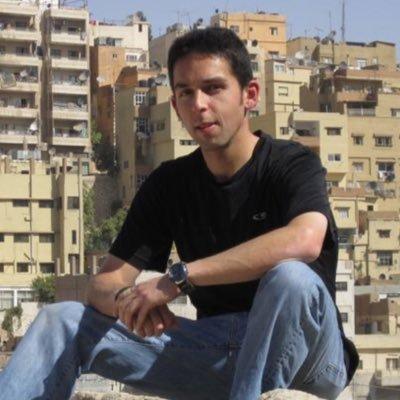
- Josh Campbell in 2018
- Born: August 31, 1983 (age 43); Austin, Texas, U.S.
- Education: University of Texas at Austin; Johns Hopkins University
- Occupations: Journalist, analyst
- Employer: CNN

Joshua Campbell (born August 31, 1983) is an American correspondent with CNN, former U.S. intelligence community official, and military veteran. He serves as an adjunct senior fellow and national security policy researcher with the Center for a New American Security.

Campbell previously served as a Supervisory Special Agent with the U.S. Federal Bureau of Investigation conducting national security and criminal investigations. His assignments included deploying in response to international terrorist attacks and kidnappings, overseas tours embedded with the CIA, U.S. Special Operations Command, and Department of State, crisis communication manager for counterterrorism, cyber and counterintelligence investigations, and was appointed Special Assistant to the FBI Director. He was awarded four FBI Combat Theater awards for his work overseas in conflict zones.

He is known for covering breaking news events involving national security matters, and reporting domestically and internationally on law enforcement issues. In addition to on-air work, he regularly contributes to CNN.com, and has been published in The New York Times, The Washington Post, and USA Today. He is also the author of a book about the FBI.

Campbell grew up in Texas, and received a B.A. in Government from The University of Texas at Austin. He received an M.A. in Communication from Johns Hopkins University and completed the Middlebury College Arabic language immersion program. Campbell is a term member with the Council on Foreign Relations, an officer in the Navy Reserve, and taught digital and national security at The University of Southern California.

== Personal life ==
Campbell married his husband on July 4, 2019.
