= Kai (name) =

- Pronunciation: /ˈkaɪ/
- Gender: Unisex

Origin
- Origin: various
- Meaning: various
- Region of origin: various

Other names
- Variant forms: Cai, Kye
- Related names: Kaj, Kay

The name Kai /ˈkaɪ/ has various origins and meanings in different cultures:

- In Estonian, Kai is a female name derived from Katherine.
- In Persian, Kai, or Kay, is a male name, meaning "king". It is also the name of a mythological shah (king) in the Shahnameh.
- In Japanese, kai has a number of meanings, including "ocean" (海), "shell" (貝), etc.
- In Hawaiian, Kai is the word for “sea” in its language.
- In Welsh, Cai is a male name derived from the Latin Caius.

== Notable people with the given name "Kai" include ==
- Kai Aareleid (born 1972), Estonian writer
- Kai Alaerts (born 1989), Belgian skier
- Kai Alexander (born 1997), British actor
- Kai Altair (born 1984), American musician
- Kai Althoff (born 1966), German multimedia artist
- Kai Ambos (born 1965), German judge
- Kai Normann Andersen (1900–1967), Danish composer
- Kai Arzheimer (born 1969), German professor
- Kai Asakura (born 1993), Japanese mixed martial artist
- Kai Atō (1946–2015), Japanese actor
- Kai Behrend, German mathematician
- Kai Belton, American politician from Connecticut
- Kai Bird (born 1951), American journalist
- Kai Bjorn (born 1968), Canadian sailor
- Kai Böcking (born 1964), German television presenter
- Kai Bracht (born 1978), German ski jumper
- Kai Brodersen (born 1958), German historian
- Kai Luke Brümmer (born 1993), South African actor
- Kai Brünker (born 1994), German footballer
- Kai Aage Bruun (1899–1971), Danish writer
- Kai Budde (1979–2026), German gamer
- Kai Bülow (born 1986), German footballer
- Kai Bumann (1961–2022), German conductor
- Kai Burger (born 1992), German footballer
- Kai Cenat (born 2001), American YouTuber
- Chang Kai (born 1964), Chinese physicist
- Chen Kai (born 1993), Chinese footballer
- Kai Chang (born 2000), Jamaican discus thrower
- Kai Cipot (born 2001), Slovenian footballer
- Kai Compagner (born 1969), Dutch rower
- Kai Corbett (born 2002), Spanish footballer
- Kai Correa (born 1988), American baseball coach
- Cui Kai (born 1982), Chinese track and field athlete
- Cui Kai (footballer) (born 1987), Chinese footballer
- Kai Curry-Lindahl (1917–1990), Swedish zoologist
- Deng Kai (born 1959), Chinese politician
- Kai Diekmann (born 1964), German journalist
- Kai Donner (1888–1935), Finnish linguist
- Kai Ebel (born 1964), German sports journalist
- Kai Eckhardt (born 1961), German musician
- Kai Edwards (swimmer) (born 1998), Australian swimmer
- Kai Edwards (basketball) (born 1997), Dutch basketball player
- Kai Eide (born 1949), Norwegian diplomat
- Kai Ekanger (1929–2018), Norwegian politician
- Kai Ellis (born 1980), American football player
- Kai Engelke (1946–2025), German poet, writer, and music journalist
- Kai Arne Engelstad (born 1954), Norwegian speed skater
- Kai Ephron (born 1965), American film director
- Kai T. Erikson (1931–2025), Austrian-born American sociologist
- Kai Ewans (1906–1988), Dutch-American musician
- Kai Fagaschinski (born 1974), German musician
- Kai Falkenberg, American lawyer
- Kai Falkenthal (born 1965), German yacht racer
- Kai G. Farley (born 1973), Liberian politician
- Feng Kai (born 1974), Chinese speed skater
- Kai Fischer (born 1934), German actress
- Kai Fjell (1907–1989), Norwegian painter
- Kai Abdul Foday (1924–2013), Sierra Leonean politician
- Kai Forbath (born 1987), American football player
- Kai Fotheringham (born 2003), Scottish footballer
- Kai Frobel, German ecologist
- Kai Gehring (born 1977), German politician
- Kai Gehring (footballer) (born 1988), German footballer
- Gong Kai (1222–1307), Chinese politician
- Kai Greene (born 1975), American bodybuilder
- Kai Greene (soccer) (born 1993), American soccer player
- Kai Grjotheim (1919–2003), Norwegian chemist
- Kai Gronauer (born 1986), German baseball player
- Kai Gullmar (1905–1982), Swedish composer
- Kai Haaskivi (born 1955), Finnish footballer
- Kai Häfner (born 1989), German handball player
- Kai Hahto (born 1973), Finnish drummer
- Kai Hansen (born 1963), German musician
- Kai Harada (born 1999), Japanese rock climber
- Kai Havertz (born 1999), German footballer
- Kai Heerings (born 1990), Dutch footballer
- Kai Helenius (1931–2023), Finnish diplomat
- Kai G. Henriksen (1956–2016), Norwegian businessman
- Kai Herdling (born 1984), German footballer
- Kai Erik Herlovsen (born 1959), Norwegian footballer
- Kai Hermann (born 1938), German journalist
- Kai Hesse (born 1985), German footballer
- Kai Hibbard (born 1978), American activist
- Kai Hietarinta (born 1932), Finnish businessman and ice hockey executive
- Kai Hirano (born 1987), Japanese footballer
- Kai Hirschmann, English civil servant
- Kai Ho (1859–1914), Hong Kong barrister
- Kai Holm (1896–1985), Danish actor
- Kai Holst (1913–1945), Norwegian activist
- Kai Honasan, Filipino singer-songwriter
- Kai Hormann (born 1974), German computer scientist
- Kai Horstmann (born 1981), English rugby union footballer
- Kai Horwitz (born 1998), Chilean skier
- Kai Hospelt (born 1985), German ice hockey player
- Hou Kai (born 1962), Chinese politician
- Hu Kai (born 1982), Chinese sprinter
- Kai Huckenbeck (born 1993), German speedway racer
- Kai Huisman (born 1995), Dutch footballer
- Kai Hundertmarck (born 1969), German cyclist
- Kai Ishii (born 1993), Japanese rugby union footballer
- Kai Ishizu (born 2002), Japanese footballer
- Kai Ishizawa (born 1996), Japanese boxer
- Kai Jahnsson (born 1965), Finnish sport shooter
- Kai Jensen (1897–1997), Danish athlete
- Kai Johan Jiang (born 1965), Swedish-Chinese businessman
- Kai Johansen (1940–2007), Danish footballer
- Kai Johansson (born 1969), Finnish swimmer
- Kai Jones (born 2001), Bahamian basketball player
- Kai Kahele (born 1974), American politician
- Kai Kalima (1945–2023), Finnish politician
- Kai Kamaka III (born 1995), American mixed martial artist
- Kai Kantola (born 1987), Finnish-American ice hockey player
- Kai Kara-France (born 1993), New Zealand mixed martial artist
- Kai Karsten (born 1968), German sprinter
- Kai Kasiguran (born 1985), American soccer player
- Kai Kazmirek (born 1991), German decathlete
- Kai Kennedy (born 2002), Scottish footballer
- Kai Killerud (1940 - 2021), Norwegian handball player
- Kai Klefisch (born 1999), German footballer
- Kai Knagenhjelm (1898–1987), Norwegian civil servant
- Kai Knudsen (1903–1977), Norwegian judge
- Kai Ko (born 1991), Taiwanese actor and singer
- Kai Kobayashi (born 1993), Japanese racewalker
- Kai A. Konrad (born 1961), German economist
- Kai Koreniuk (born 1998), Dutch-American soccer player
- Kai Kovaljeff (born 1985), Finnish ski jumper
- Kai Aage Krarup (1915–2013), Danish equestrian
- Kai Krause (born 1957), German software designer
- Kai Kroeger (born 2002), American football player
- Kai Krüger (born 1940), Norwegian jurist
- Kai Kyllönen (born 1965), Finnish athlete
- Kai Lagesen (born 1965), Norwegian footballer
- Kai Langerfeld (born 1987), Canadian rower
- Kai Larsen (1926–2012), Danish botanist
- Kai Laukkanen (born 1975), Finnish motorcycle racer
- Kai Lawonn (born 1985), German computer scientist
- Kai Lee, Chinese-American scientist
- Kai Leete (1910–1995), Estonian ballet and folk dancer
- Kai Lehtinen (born 1958), Finnish actor
- Kai Lenny (born 1992), American surfer
- Li Kai (born 1989), Chinese footballer
- Kai Li (born 1954), Chinese-American computer scientist
- Kai Li (businessman) (born 1962), Chinese-American businessman
- Liang Kai (1140–1210), Chinese painter
- Kai Lightner (born 1999), American climber
- Kai Lindberg (1899–1985), Danish politician
- Ling Kai (born 1986), Singaporean singer-songwriter
- Kai Linnilä (1942–2017), Finnish editor
- Liu Kai (disambiguation), multiple people
- Kai Locksley (born 1996), American football player
- Kai Londo (1845–1896), Sierra Leonean warrior
- Kai Lossgott (born 1980), German-South African artist
- Lu Kai (198–269/270), Chinese military general
- Lü Kai (died 225), Chinese politician
- Lu Kai (badminton) (born 1991), Chinese badminton player
- Kai Luibrand (born 1994), German footballer
- Kai Lykke (1625–1699), Danish noble
- Ma Kai (born 1946), Chinese politician
- Kai Mahler (born 1995), Swiss skier
- Kai Matsuzaki (born 1997), Japanese footballer
- Kai McKenzie-Lyle (born 1997), English footballer
- Kai Meriluoto (born 2003), Finnish footballer
- Kai Merk (born 1998), German footballer
- Kai Metov (born 1964), Russian singer-songwriter
- Kai Michalke (born 1976), German footballer
- Kai Miki (born 1993), Japanese footballer
- Kai Møller (1859–1940), Norwegian politician
- Kai Montinola (born 2006), Filipino model and actress
- Kai Müller (born 1988), German canoeist
- Kai Mykkänen (born 1979), Finnish politician
- Kai Nacua (born 1995), American football player
- Kai Nielsen (disambiguation), multiple people
- Kai Niemi (born 1955), Finnish motorcycle racer
- Kai Nieminen (born 1950), Finnish writer
- Kai Nurminen (born 1969), Finnish ice hockey player
- Kai Nürnberger (born 1966), German basketball player
- Kai Nyyssönen (born 1972), Finnish footballer
- Kai O'Donnell (born 1999), Australian rugby league footballer
- Kai Ortio (born 1965), Finnish ice hockey player
- Kai Oswald (born 1977), German footballer
- Kai Outa (1930–2002), Finnish weightlifter
- Kai Øverland (1931–1975), Norwegian politician
- Kai Owen (born 1975), Welsh actor
- Kai Owen (rugby union) (born 1999), English rugby union footballer
- Kai Owens (born 2004), American skier
- Kai Ozaki (born 1987), Japanese skier
- Kai Paananen (born 1954), Finnish businessman
- Kai Pahlman (1935–2013), Finnish footballer
- Kai Pearce-Paul (born 2001), English rugby league footballer
- Kai Peterson (born 1962), German actor
- Kai Pfeiffer (born 1975), German visual artist
- Kai Pflaume (born 1967), German television presenter
- Kai Pirttijärvi, Finnish athlete
- Poh Soo Kai (born 1930), Singaporean doctor
- Kai Pröger (born 1992), German footballer
- Kai Puolamäki, Finnish physician
- Qidiao Kai, Chinese philosopher
- Qin Kai (disambiguation), multiple people
- Kai Rapsch (born 1978), German musician
- Kai Rautio (born 1964), Finnish ice hockey player
- Kai Remlov (born 1946), Norwegian actor
- Kai Reus (born 1985), Dutch cyclist
- Kai Rimmel (born 1952), Estonian politician
- Kai Risholt (born 1979), Norwegian footballer
- Kai Røberg (born 1973), Norwegian footballer
- Kai Rooney (born 2009), English footballer
- Kai Rossen, German chemist
- Kai Rüder (born 1971), German equestrian
- Kai Rüütel (born 1981), Estonian singer
- Kai Ryssdal (born 1963), American radio journalist
- Kai Sakakibara (born 1996), Australian cyclist
- Kai Salomaa, Finnish-Canadian computer scientist
- Kai Sasaki (born 1998), Japanese footballer
- Kai Sato (born 1984), American entrepreneur
- Kai Sauer (born 1967), German-Finnish diplomat
- Kai Schäfer (born 1993), German badminton player
- Kai Schoppitsch (born 1980), Austrian footballer
- Kai Schramayer (born 1968), German wheelchair tennis player
- Kai Schumacher (born 1979), German pianist
- Kai Schwertfeger (born 1988), German footballer
- Kai Scott (born 1970), American attorney
- Kai Selvon (born 1992), Trinidadian sprinter
- Kai Setälä (1913–2005), Finnish professor
- Kai Shibato (born 1995), Japanese footballer
- Kai Siegbahn (1918–2007), Swedish physicist
- Kai Simons (born 1938), Finnish professor
- Kai Sjøberg (1936–1994), Norwegian footballer
- Kai Smith (born 2004), Emirati cricketer
- Kai Somerto (1925–1969), Finnish diplomat
- Song Kai (disambiguation), multiple people
- Kai Soremekun, Canadian filmmaker
- Kai Sotto (born 2002), Filipino basketball player
- Kai Staats (born 1970), American filmmaker
- Kai Starr (born 1964), American author
- Kai Steffen (born 1961), German footballer
- Kai Ove Stokkeland (born 1978), Norwegian football manager
- Kai Stratznig (born 2002), Austrian footballer
- Kai Strauss (born 1970), German singer
- Kai Suikkanen (born 1959), Finnish ice hockey player
- Sun Kai (born 1991), Chinese footballer
- Kai Swoboda (born 1971), Australian canoeist
- Kai Syväsalmi, Finnish ice hockey player
- Tan Kai (born 1973), Chinese computer technician
- Tang Kai (born 1996), Chinese mixed martial artist
- Kai Cheng Thom, Canadian writer
- Tian Kai (died 199), Chinese general
- Kai Tier, Australian comedian
- Kai Toews (born 1998), Japanese basketball player
- Kai Tracid (born 1972), German disc jockey
- Kai Trewin (born 2001), Australian footballer
- Kai Trump (born 2007), American social media personality
- Kai Twilfer (born 1976), German merchant
- Kai Ueda (born 1996), Japanese baseball player
- Kai van Hese (born 1989), Dutch footballer
- Kai Verbij (born 1994), Dutch speed skater
- Kai von Warburg (born 1968), German rower
- Kai Wagner (born 1997), German footballer
- Wang Kai (disambiguation), multiple people
- Kai Walter (born 1973), German canoeist
- Kai Wargalla (born 1984), German politician
- Kai Warner (1926–1982), German musician
- Kai Wartiainen (born 1953), Finnish architect
- Kai Wegner (born 1972), German politician
- Kai Wehmeier (born 1968), German-American philosopher
- Kai Wessel (disambiguation), multiple people
- Kai Whittaker (born 1985), German politician
- Kai Widdrington (born 1995), British dancer
- Kai Wiesinger (born 1966), German actor
- Kai Ashante Wilson, American author
- Kai Winding (1922–1983), Danish-American musician
- Kai Wright, American journalist
- Kai Wucherpfennig, German-American biologist
- Kai Wulff (born 1949), American actor
- Xing Kai (born 1989), Chinese footballer
- Xu Kai (born 1995), Chinese actor
- Kai Yearn (born 2005), English footballer
- Yee Seu Kai, Malaysian politician
- Kai Zeiglar (born 1981), American football player
- Kai Zen (actress) (born 2012), American actress
- Zhang Kai (born 1982), Chinese basketball player
- Zhang Kai (lawyer), Chinese lawyer
- Zheng Kai (born 1986), Chinese actor
- Zong Kai, Chinese Paralympic athlete
- Zou Kai (born 1988), Chinese gymnast

=== Cai ===
- Cai Cortez (born 1988), Filipino actress
- Cai Emmons (1951–2023), American author
- Cai Evans (born 1999), Welsh professional rugby union player
- Cai Griffiths (born 1984), Welsh rugby union player
- Cai Gundelach (1891–1954), Danish equestrian
- Cai Hegermann-Lindencrone (1807–1893), Danish general and politician
- Cai-Göran Alexander Stubb (born 1968), Finnish politician

== Fictional characters ==
- Sir Kay, Knight of Arthur's Round Table
- General Kai, the main antagonist in Kung Fu Panda 3
- Kai Anderson, a character in American Horror Story: Cult
- Kai, a character in Ninjago
- Kai, one of the nine default heroes featured in Minecraft
- Kai, one of the eight major characters and is a member of the Pickles team in Pixar's Win or Lose
- Kai Chen, a character in the television series Power Rangers Lost Galaxy
- Kai Hiwatari, a character in Beyblade
- Kai Lung, a character in an eponymous novel series written by Ernest Bramah
- Kai Shiden, a character in Mobile Suit Gundam
- Shahnameh. Kai is the son of Kay Qobād and is succeeded by his grandson Kay Khosrow.
- Cai, a protagonist from the video game Fire Emblem: Fortune's Weave

== Notable people with the surname "Kai" include ==
- Akihito Kai (born 1987), Japanese handball player
- Asami Kai (born 1987), Japanese actress
- Bertrand Kaï (born 1983), New Caledonian footballer
- Carole Kai (born 1944), American entertainer
- Dakota Kai (born 1988), New Zealand professional wrestler
- Haji Kai (born 1971), Tanzanian politician
- Kai Feng (1906–1955), Chinese politician
- Kentaro Kai (born 1994), Japanese footballer
- Konomi Kai (born 1993), Japanese long jumper
- Lani Kai (1936–1999), American singer
- Leilani Kai (born 1960), American professional wrestler
- Marie Kai (born 1980), Japanese actress
- Masato Kai (born 2003), Japanese volleyball player
- Natasha Kai (born 1983), American soccer player
- Roland B. Kai, Liberian politician
- Shingo Kai (born 1963), Japanese water polo player
- Shintaro Kai (born 1981), Japanese golfer
- Shouma Kai (born 1997), Japanese actor
- Sibo Kai, Indian politician
- Takuya Kai (born 1992), Japanese baseball player
- Tomomi Kai (born 1983), Japanese shogi player
- Toshimitsu Kai (born 1956), Japanese golfer
- Yasuhiro Kai (born 1968), Japanese judoka
- Yukiko Kai (1954–1980), Japanese manga artist
- Yung Kai, Chinese-Canadian musician

== See also ==
- Kai (disambiguation), a disambiguation page for "Kai"
- Kay (disambiguation), a disambiguation page for "Kay"
