= Grand Gedeh-2 =

Electoral district in Liberia

- Constituency for the House of Representatives of Liberia
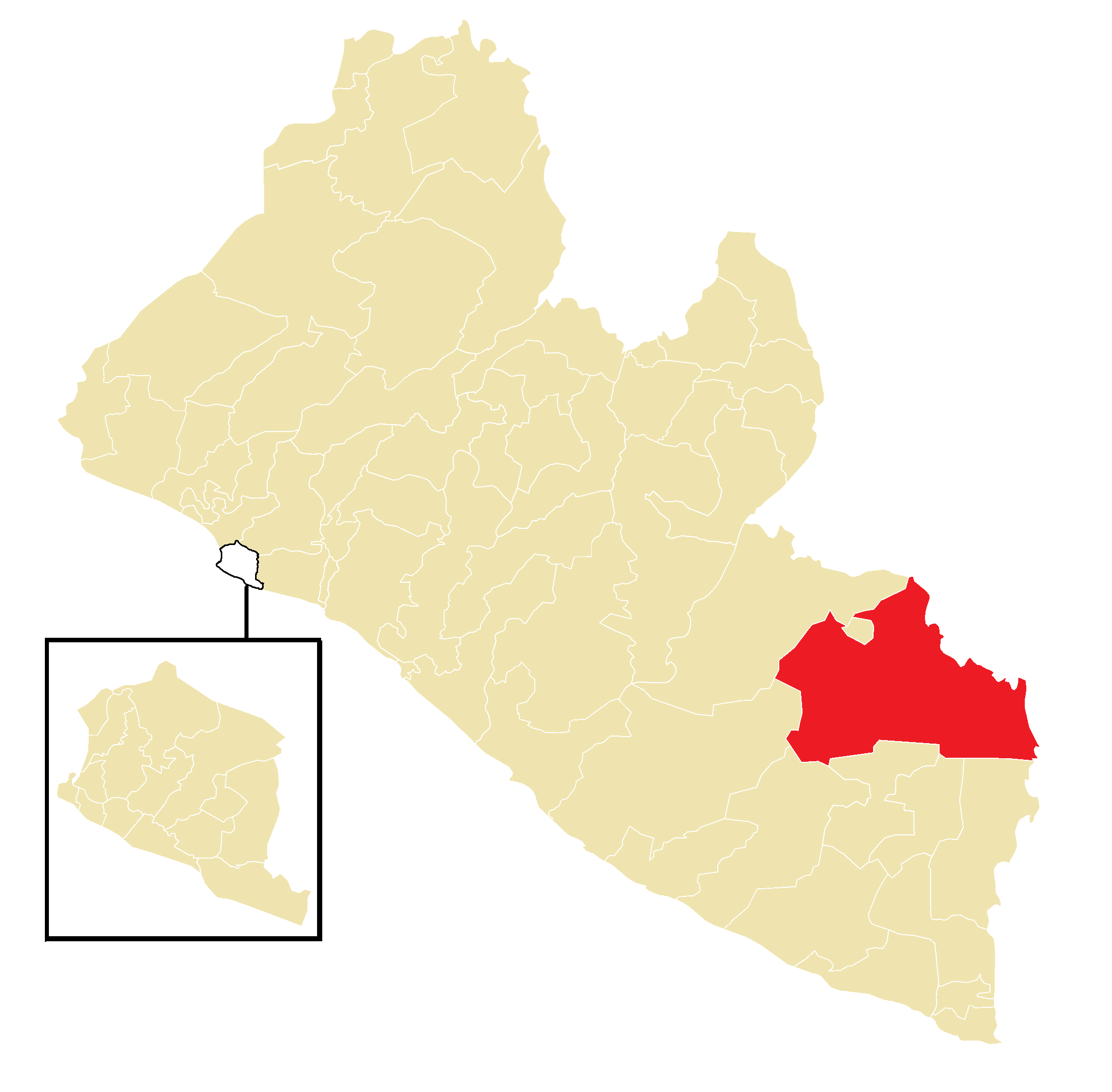
- Electorate: 20,026 (2023)

Current constituency
- Created: 2011
- Representative: Marie G. Johnson

Grand Gedeh-2 is an electoral district for the elections to the House of Representatives of Liberia. The constituency covers Glio-Twarbo District, Konobo District, Putu District, Tchien District and the Lower Gorbo community of Cavalla District.

== Elected representatives ==
Year	Representative elected	Party	Notes
2005	Zoe E. Pennue	IND	
2011	Morais T. Waylee	UP	
2017	George Boley	UPP	
2023	Marie G. Johnson	LRP	

== Election results ==
2005 Grand Gedeh County's 2nd House District Election
Candidate	Party	Votes	%
Zoe E. Pennue	Independent	5,044	57.90
Goldy William Saydee	Liberty Party	936	10.75
James Chollos Tailey	Coalition for the Transformation of Liberia	798	9.16
Samuel Drowuneneh Tarley	Alliance for Peace and Democracy	564	6.47
Dailah Martha Tweh	Congress for Democratic Change	447	5.13
Abou M. Turay	National Democratic Party of Liberia	400	4.59
Benyea Cecelia Zarkpa	Unity Party	269	3.09
William Buster Tarley	All Liberia Coalition Party	253	2.90
Total		8,711	100.00
Valid votes		8,711	93.21
Invalid/blank votes		635	6.79
Total votes		9,346	100.00

2011 Grand Gedeh County's 2nd House District Election
Candidate	Party	Votes	%
Morais T. Waylee	Unity Party	1,941	21.59
Pyne Wallo	National Democratic Coalition	1,780	19.80
Kai Garlo Farley	Congress for Democratic Change	1,690	18.80
William Bedell Yorke	Union of Liberian Democrats	1,243	13.82
Patrick Gweah Bowah Jr.	Liberia Transformation Party	1,241	13.80
Joseph W. Geebro	Liberia Restoration Party	632	7.03
A. Nathaniel Tailey Geelia	Progressive Democratic Party	288	3.20
Moses Z. Jackson	Movement for Progressive Change	176	1.96
Total		8,991	100.00
Valid votes		8,991	96.36
Invalid/blank votes		340	3.64
Total votes		9,331	100.00

2017 Grand Gedeh County's 2nd House District Election
Candidate	Party	Votes	%
George Boley	United People's Party	2,093	18.31
Patrick G. Bowah Jr.	Liberia Transformation Party	1,736	15.19
Willie McGill Dweh	Unity Party	1,433	12.54
Victoria Gaye Zulu	Movement for Economic Empowerment	1,032	9.03
Pyne Wallo	People's Unification Party	1,024	8.96
Isaac Nyon Zulu Sr.	Alternative National Congress	929	8.13
Kai Garlo Farley	Coalition for Democratic Change	810	7.09
William Bedell Yorke	Redemption Democratic Congress	631	5.52
A. Nathaniel T. Geelia	Grassroot Democratic Party of Liberia	621	5.43
Philip Bas Kamah II	Coalition for Liberia's Progress	414	3.62
Ruth J. Milton	All Liberian Party	360	3.15
Anthony Tailey Barwu Sr.	Liberty Party	281	2.46
Moses Zulu Jackson	Movement for Progressive Change	64	0.56
Total		11,428	100.00
Valid votes		11,428	95.54
Invalid/blank votes		533	4.46
Total votes		11,961	100.00
