= Steffen =

Steffen is a surname and given name, and may refer to:

== Surname ==
- Albert Steffen (1884–1963), Swiss poet, painter, and novelist
- Alex Steffen (b. 1968), American writer and environmental futurist
- Alexander Steffen (born 1993), German politician
- Anthony Steffen (1929–2004), Brazilian actor; acted in many spaghetti westerns
- Britta Steffen (b. 1983), German Olympic swimmer
- Clare E. Steffen (b. 1954), American psychologist
- David Steffen, American businessman and politician
- Hans Steffen (1865–1937), German geographer and explorer of Patagonia
- Jason Steffen (b. 1975), American physicist
- Jim Steffen (1936–2015), American football player
- Kai Steffen (born 1961), German football player
- Konrad Steffen (1952-2020), Swiss glaciologist and Arctic climate researcher
- Niklas Steffen (born 2001), Swiss footballer
- Otto Steffen (b. 1874, d. unknown), American Olympic gymnast
- Renato Steffen (born 1991), Swiss football player
- Sonja Steffen (b. 1963), German politician
- Thomas L. Steffen (1930–2020), American judge
- Till Steffen (born 1973), German lawyer and politician
- Waldemar Steffen (b. 1872, d. unknown), German Olympic track and field athlete
- Walter Steffen (1886–1937), American professional football player
- Willi Steffen (1925–2005), Swiss football player
- William L. Steffen (1947–2023), Australian climate science expert and researcher
- Zack Steffen (born 1995), American soccer player

== Given name ==
- Steffen Dittes (born 1973), German politician
- Steffen Freiberg (born 1981), German politician
- Steffen Frølund (born 1984), Danish politician
- Steffen Grosse (born 1967), German politician
- Steffen Holme Helledie (born 1989), Danish politician
- Steffen Jürgens (born 1967), German actor and film director
- Steffen Larsen (born 1983), Danish politician
- Steffen Møller (born 1977), Danish engineer
- Steffen Roth (born 1976), German academic
- Steffen Schütz (born 1966), German politician
- Steffen Tangstad (1959–2024), Norwegian boxer

== See also ==
- Steffen Glacier in the Northern Patagonian Ice Field
