= Tuzon =

Town in Grand Gedeh County, Liberia

- Location in Liberia
- Coordinates: 6°10′25″N 8°15′0″W
- Country: Liberia
- County: Grand Gedeh County
- District: Tchien District
- Climate: Am

Tuzon is a small town in south-eastern Liberia, situated in Grand Gedeh County. It is located twelve miles (19 km) north of Zwedru, the county seat. Tuzon is a stronghold of the Krahn people.

It is mainly known as the birthplace of former President Samuel Doe, the country's 21st president.

In 1990 during the Liberian Civil War, Tuzon was ravaged by the rebel army of Charles Taylor, who seven years later became president. Local residents fled to Côte d'Ivoire.
