= Grand Gedeh-3 =

Electoral district in Liberia

- Constituency for the House of Representatives of Liberia
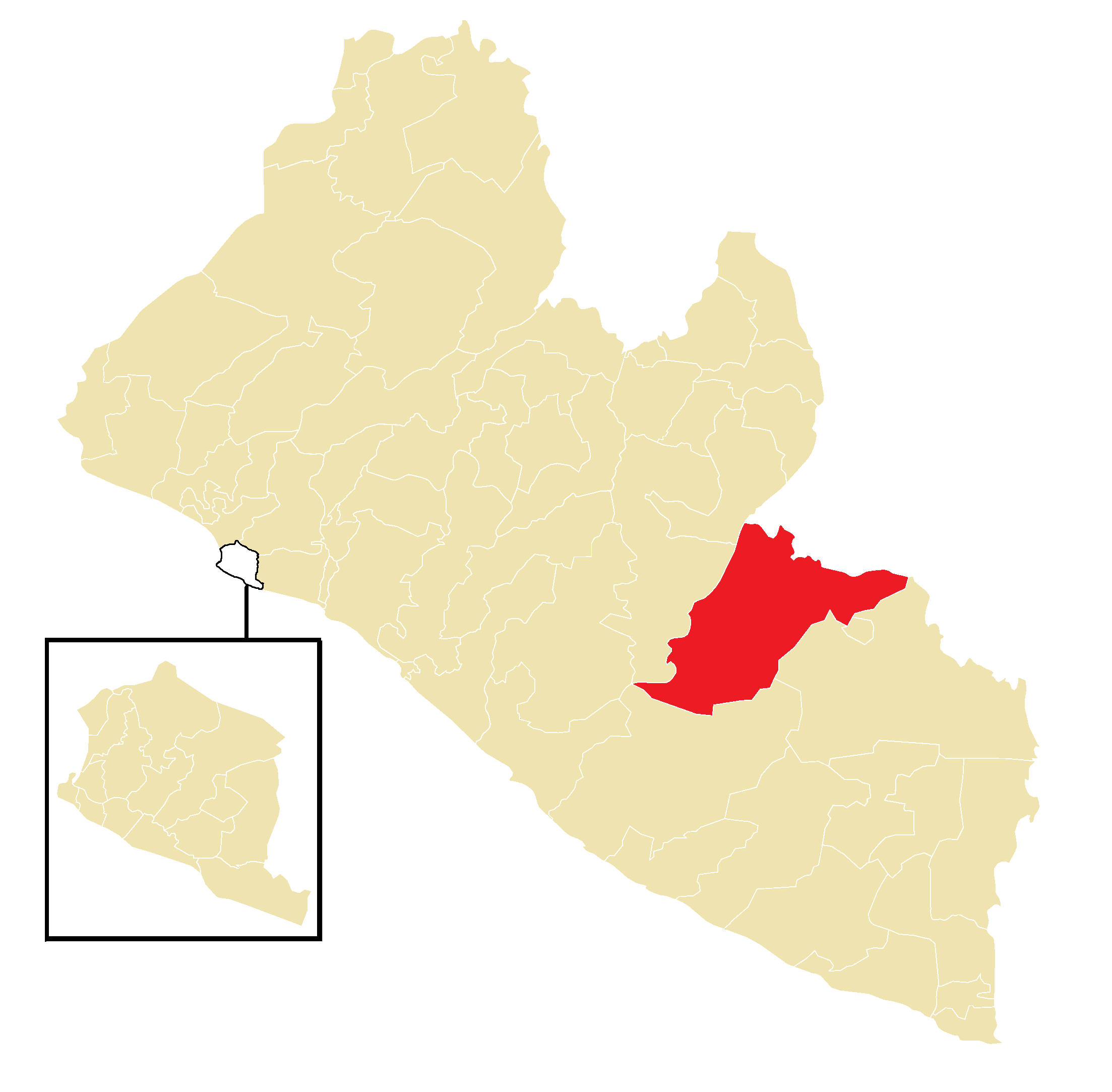
- Electorate: 23,509 (2023)

Current constituency
- Created: 2011
- Representative: Jacob C. Debee, II

Grand Gedeh-3 is an electoral district for the elections to the House of Representatives of Liberia. The constituency covers B'hai District, Gbao District, Gboe-Ploe District and Cavalla District (except the Lower Gorbo community).

== Elected representatives ==
Year	Representative elected	Party	Notes
2005	Kai G. Farley	CDC	
2011	Alex C. Grant	MPC	
2017	Alex C. Grant	CDC	
2023	Jacob C. Debee, II	LINU	

== Election results ==
2005 Grand Gedeh County's 3rd House District Election
Candidate	Party	Votes	%
Kai G. Farley	Congress for Democratic Change	2,099	36.21
Patrick G. Bowah	All Liberia Coalition Party	1,062	18.32
Tarwoe Ib Waylee	Reformed United Liberia Party	1,003	17.31
Morais T. Waylee	Coalition for the Transformation of Liberia	770	13.29
J. Karyowl Taryon Sr.	New Deal Movement	530	9.14
Mahalia Dorothy Nuah	Liberty Party	332	5.73
Total		5,796	100.00
Valid votes		5,796	97.77
Invalid/blank votes		132	2.23
Total votes		5,928	100.00

2011 Grand Gedeh County's 3rd House District Election
Candidate	Party	Votes	%
Alex C. Grant	Movement for Progressive Change	1,665	15.40
William Surveyea Karyee	Original Congress Party of Liberia	1,515	14.01
Helena Nelson Deh	Unity Party	1,023	9.46
Maxwell Zamie Tody	Victory for Change Party	975	9.02
Justin B. G. Quetoh	Liberia Restoration Party	972	8.99
Rufus Wenblayon Gbieor	National Democratic Coalition	954	8.83
D. Abugarshall Kai	Liberia Transformation Party	883	8.17
Kai Matthew Whyee	Union of Liberian Democrats	770	7.12
Wahay Telojoye Collins	Citizens Unification Party	636	5.88
William Glay	Grassroot Democratic Party of Liberia	634	5.86
David Trugborweay Togba	Progressive Democratic Party	426	3.94
Teddy Thompson Gbowoe	National Patriotic Party	357	3.30
Total		10,810	100.00
Valid votes		10,810	93.79
Invalid/blank votes		716	6.21
Total votes		11,526	100.00

2017 Grand Gedeh County's 3rd House District Election
Candidate	Party	Votes	%
Alex C. Grant (Incumbent)	Coalition for Democratic Change	2,711	21.08
William S. Karyee	Vision for Liberia Transformation	1,885	14.66
Betty Breeze Doh	Liberia Transformation Party	1,725	13.41
Ophoree Diah	United People's Party	1,431	11.13
T. Wilson Gaye	Liberty Party	1,281	9.96
Emmanuel K. Z. Pour	Movement for Progressive Change	1,038	8.07
J. Cheategba Debee II	Liberia National Union	835	6.49
Weafus Kamawon Quitoe Sr.	Movement for Economic Empowerment	651	5.06
Maxwell Zamie Tody	All Liberian Party	478	3.72
Edward Q. Teah	Democratic Justice Party	202	1.57
Helena Nelson Deh	Unity Party	139	1.08
Henry Nathaniel Younis	Alternative National Congress	138	1.07
Harry Gbay Kantu	Liberian People's Party	132	1.03
Angelo Z. Cooper	People's Unification Party	114	0.89
Phe-Phe Ala Tarlue	Coalition for Liberia's Progress	100	0.78
Total		12,860	100.00
Valid votes		12,860	94.95
Invalid/blank votes		684	5.05
Total votes		13,544	100.00
