= Gwin Town =

Village in Grand Gedeh County, Liberia

Gwin Town Bablobli Babloh-Bli
- Location in Liberia
- Coordinates: 6°12′16″N 8°22′12″W
- Country: Liberia
- County: Grand Gedeh County
- District: Tchien District
- Climate: Am

Gwin Town (also known as Bablobli or Babloh-Bli) is a populated place in the county of Grand Gedeh in Liberia.
