= Santa with Muscles =

1996 film directed by John Murlowski

- VHS Poster
- Directed by: John Murlowski
- Written by: Jonathan Bond; Fred Mata; Dorrie Krum Raymond
- Produced by: Brian Schuster; Jordan Belfort
- Starring: Hulk Hogan; Ed Begley Jr.; Don Stark; Robin Curtis; Kevin West; Garrett Morris
- Cinematography: Michael Gfelner
- Edited by: William Marrinson; Stephen R. Myers
- Music by: James Covell
- Production companies: Legacy Releasing; Hit Entertainment
- Distributed by: Cabin Fever Entertainment (USA); Cineplex Odeon Films (Canada); Scotty Gelt Films (Foreign)
- Release date: November 8, 1996
- Running time: 97 minutes
- Country: United States
- Language: English
- Box office: $220,198

Santa with Muscles is a 1996 American Christmas comedy film starring Hulk Hogan and directed by John Murlowski. It was released for two weeks in cinemas.

== Plot ==
The movie starts off with Elizabeth writing a letter to Santa, explaining that the citizens of Lakeville have left because of an evil scientist named Ebner Frost, who plans to buy the orphanage. He bullies Mr. Rini into selling his shoe store with the help of his henchmen, Drs. Blight, Watt, Flint, and Vial. Rini relents, and the orphanage is the last to be targeted.

Blake Thorn, a conceited self-made millionaire who sells bodybuilding supplements and equipment that have his picture on them, practices exercises with his staff before joining up with his paintball squad. He is targeted by police, including an officer named Hinkley, after he and his friends are caught speeding. Abandoning them, he hides out at a shopping mall that is waiting for its mall Santa to show, and changes into a Santa costume. He manages to trick Hinkley and another officer at first, who are looking for him, until Hickey spots Thorn’s paintball uniform and gives chase again. Blake hides out in a garbage chute, but as the officers leave, a janitor throws a big Christmas display that knocks Blake out and sends him down to the bottom floor. An elf named Lenny assumes him to be another drunk mall Santa and proceeds to rob him of his money until he realizes that he’s hit the jackpot upon finding Blake’s ID. Blake has no memory of his name when he comes to, but Lenny convinces him that he’s Santa.

Blake assumes the identity of the mall Santa for the kids until he sees two people steal money set aside to help the orphanage. Santa battles the two crooks and gets rousing applause from the long line of people at the mall. Upon seeing a picture of the orphanage, Blake visits and helps out after Blight almost runs his ice cream truck over Clayton. Blake meets Leslie and the last three children remaining: Taylor, Sarah, and Elizabeth. He is interviewed by the news when the local papers refer to Blake/Santa as ’Santa with Muscles’. It is also revealed that Lenny owes a sum of money to both Frost and Blight, and Frost wants Lenny to get the Santa out of the orphanage, not realizing that Santa is Blake.

Blake helps out when the orphanage gets attacked by Blight and Vial, but he manages to fend off their attacks. Taylor heads off to deal with Ebner Frost at his mansion, but Blake catches him and has Lenny take him back to the orphanage. Blake asks the kids if there’s anything special about the place, and the kids mention an underground vault. The kids figured out the three combination numbers, but they have trouble with the fourth. Blake figures out the fourth number and opens the vault to reveal geode-like magical crystals. Blake stays to figure out how he knew the combination, while Lenny goes upstairs with the rest of the group.

The next morning, Blake fends off another attack from Blight and his henchmen, but a decorated Santa Claus pushes him out and falls onto a garbage truck. He wakes up in his mansion and gathers his staff to help fight back against Frost. However, they speed past Hinkley again and are given chase. They manage to outrun the police, but they are stopped by other patrol cars that try to blow up Thorn's vehicle with a rocket launcher, but they end up destroying Hinkley's car instead.

He rescues the kids, as well as Leslie and Clayton, the latter of whom reveals that they grew up in the orphanage together, with Ebner as his best friend, until they had a falling out. They all defeat the henchmen, and Lenny helps out as well, having felt guilty about betraying the orphanage. Frost and his henchmen are arrested, but the orphanage is destroyed by a crystal overload. Frost's compound is now the new orphanage founded and helped run by Blake. Many more orphans have joined since then. They all watch through a telescope at Frost and his henchman doing hard labor in the prison yard.

== Cast ==
- Hulk Hogan as Blake Thorn
- Don Stark as Lenny
- Robin Curtis as Leslie
- Garrett Morris as Clayton
- Aria Curzon as Elizabeth
- Adam Wylie as Taylor
- Mila Kunis as Sarah
- Clint Howard as Hinkley
- Steve Valentine as Dr. Blight
- Ed Begley Jr. as Ebner Frost
- Jennifer Paz as Helen Chu
- William Newman as Chas
- Kai Ephron as Dr. Vial
- Diane Robin as Dr. Watt
- Kevin West as Dr. Flint
- Ed Leslie as Sumo Lab Assistant
- Brenda Song as Susan
- Pierre Dulat as Pierre
- Pete Antico as Nose Ring
- Bob Apisa as Franco

== Release ==
=== Box office ===
Santa with Muscles was released on November 8, 1996 grossing $120,932 in its opening weekend. The film grossed a total of $220,198 during its two-week run.

== Reception ==
Santa with Muscles does not have a rating on the review aggregator Rotten Tomatoes.

=== Critical response ===
Joe Leydon of Variety described Santa with Muscles as a "weakling of a comedy" and thought that Hogan's performance was lacking the charisma of his previous work such as Suburban Commando. Leydon panned the direction in particular, stating: "Working from an irredeemably bland screenplay, John Murlowski directs with all the enthusiasm of someone going through the motions to pay off a debt."

Chris Hicks, writing for the Deseret News, stated that films such as Santa with Muscles make films like Jingle All The Way look better, and said that Hulk Hogan "makes Arnold Schwarzenegger seem like Laurence Olivier".

MaryAnn Johanson of Flick Filosopher called it "a deeply awful comedy" and "Believe me, it’s even dumber than it sounds."

=== Legacy ===
Reception for Santa with Muscles has continued to be negative. As of December 2011 it was listed at number 62 on IMDB's bottom 100 movies. It was listed as number 43 out of 50 worst children's films by Total Film, and was included in Virgin Media's list of worst Christmas movies. The film was also included on Atlantic City Weekly's list of worst holiday films, ranking third behind Santa Claus Conquers the Martians and the Star Wars Holiday Special. Due to Hogan's starring role, the film has been featured on the website Wrestlecrap, which acts as a "Hall of Shame" for the worst gimmicks and storylines in pro wrestling history. When Golden Globe nominee Mila Kunis, who made her film debut, was asked about the film in 2011 by GQ magazine, she said, "I was too young to fully understand the importance of working with Hulk Hogan. I just thought he was this huge man", while comparing the film to American Psycho 2 in which she co-starred with William Shatner.

== See also ==
- List of Christmas films
- Santa Claus in film
