= Kye (given name) =

Kye /ˈkaɪ/ is a common variant of the names Kai, Kay or Kyle. Kye also occurs, via numerous spellings, in many languages. For example, "sea" in Hawaiian, and "narrow" or "slender" in Celtic. The name may refer to:

- Kye A'Hern (born 2001), Australian mountain bike racer
- Kye Allums (born 1989), American transgender advocate
- Kye Fleming (born 1951), American singer/songwriter
- Kye Palmer (born 1962), American trumpet player
- Kye Petersen (born 1990), Canadian skier
- Kye Rymer, British Virgin Islands politician
- Kye Sones (born 1982), British musician
- Kye Stewart (born 1985), Canadian football player
- Kye Whyte (born 1999), British BMX racer
