= E. J. Gaines =

American football player (born 1992)

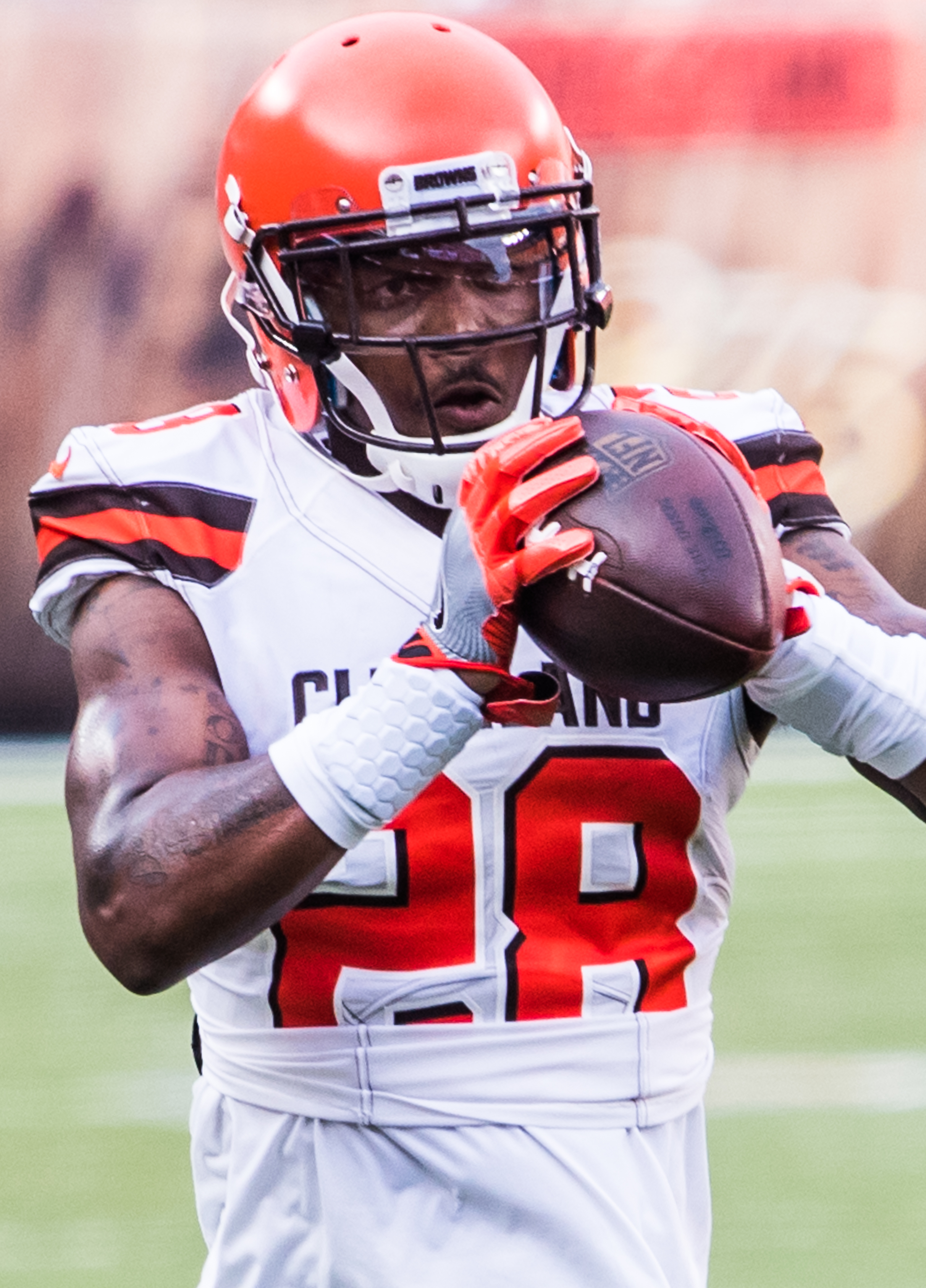
- Gaines with the Cleveland Browns in 2018

No. 33, 28
- Position: Cornerback

Personal information
- Born: February 23, 1992 (age 34); Independence, Missouri, U.S.
- Listed height: 5 ft 10 in (1.78 m)
- Listed weight: 190 lb (86 kg)

Career information
- High school: Fort Osage (Independence)
- College: Missouri (2010–2013)
- NFL draft: 2014: 6th round, 188th overall pick

Career history
- St. Louis / Los Angeles Rams (2014–2016); Buffalo Bills (2017); Cleveland Browns (2018); Buffalo Bills (2019–2020)

Awards and highlights
- PFWA All-Rookie Team (2014); First-team All-SEC (2013); First-team All-Big 12 (2011)

Career NFL statistics
- Total tackles: 198
- Forced fumbles: 4
- Fumble recoveries: 3
- Pass deflections: 33
- Interceptions: 4
- Stats at Pro Football Reference

Edwin "E. J." Gaines Jr. (born February 23, 1992) is an American former professional football player who was a cornerback in the National Football League (NFL). He played college football for the Missouri Tigers. He was selected by the St. Louis Rams in the sixth round of the 2014 NFL draft.

== Early life ==
Gaines attended Fort Osage High School in Independence, Missouri. He was a two-time First-team all-state performer, and helped lead his team to the Missouri Class 5 title game as a senior in 2009, in which he ran for 1,500 yards and 20 touchdowns and caught 20 passes for 400 yards, while also starring in the secondary by making 72 tackles and two interceptions. His junior year, he had 89 tackles and added 5 interceptions (including one he returned for a score) in 2008. He recorded 88 tackles and five interceptions as a sophomore in 2007. He was also a standout performer in track and basketball for his school, as he won all-state honors in track two different years.

Considered a three-star recruit by 247Sports.com, Gaines was listed as the No. 44 cornerback in the nation in 2010.

== College career ==
In 2010, as a true freshman at Missouri, Gaines appeared in all 13 games recording 26 tackles, as a backup cornerback. In 2011, he won a starting position and set a school record with 18 passes defended, while also finishing the season fifth on the team with 69 tackles, and two interceptions. He earned first-team All-Big 12 honors. In 2012, he led the team with 11 pass break ups and finished with a career-high 74 tackles. He also forced two fumbles and had an interception. In his senior season, he intercepted a career-high five passes while adding 75 tackles, earning himself a first-team All-SEC selection.

== Professional career ==
Pre-draft measurables
Height	Weight	Arm length	Hand span	40-yard dash	10-yard split	20-yard split	20-yard shuttle	Three-cone drill	Vertical jump	Broad jump	Bench press
5 ft 9 5/8 in (1.77 m)	190 lb (86 kg)	30 3/8 in (0.77 m)	9 3/8 in (0.24 m)	4.51 s	1.58 s	2.59 s	4.28 s	7.13 s	31 1/2 in (0.80 m)	9 ft 7 in (2.92 m)	15 reps
All values from 2014 NFL Combine

=== St. Louis / Los Angeles Rams ===
The St. Louis Rams selected Gaines in the sixth round (188th overall) of the 2014 NFL draft. Gaines was the 25th cornerback drafted in 2014.

On June 23, 2014, the Rams signed Gaines to a four-year, $2.32 million contract that includes a signing bonus of $107,672.

Throughout training camp, Gaines competed to be a backup cornerback against Brandon McGee, Quinton Pointer, Marcus Roberson, Greg Reid, and Darren Woodard. Head coach Jeff Fisher named Gaines the third cornerback on the Rams' depth chart, behind Janoris Jenkins and Trumaine Johnson.

He started 15 games his rookie season in 2014, recording 70 tackles, 14 passes defensed and two interceptions, earning him a spot on the PFWA All-Rookie Team.

After earning the starting cornerback job the previous season and during training camp, Gaines was placed on injured reserve on August 15, 2015, due to a Lisfranc injury, ending his season before it started.

Gaines returned to the starting lineup in 2016, playing in 11 games with 10 starts, recording 56 tackles and seven passes defensed. He missed five games in 2016 due to a thigh injury.

=== Buffalo Bills (first stint) ===
On August 11, 2017, the Rams traded Gaines and their second round pick (56th overall) in the 2018 NFL draft to the Buffalo Bills in exchange for wide receiver Sammy Watkins and a sixth round pick (195th overall) in the 2018 NFL draft. He started 11 games in 2017, recording 59 tackles, nine passes defensed, three forced fumbles, and one interception.

=== Cleveland Browns ===
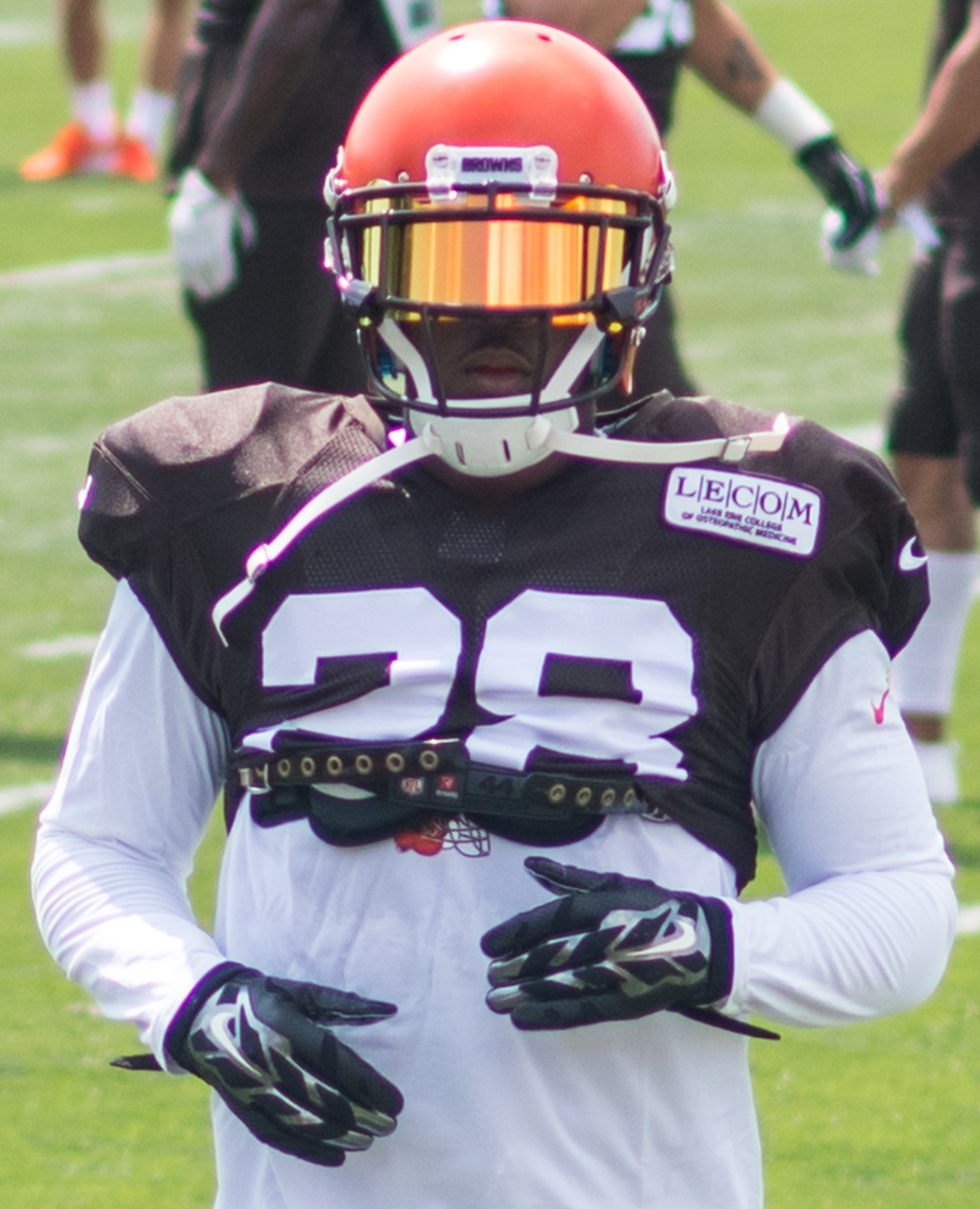
Gaines with the Browns in 2018

Gaines signed with the Cleveland Browns on March 23, 2018, reuniting with former Rams defensive coordinator Gregg Williams. In Week 4 against the Oakland Raiders, Gaines intercepted quarterback Derek Carr and made five tackles in a 45–42 overtime loss. On November 7, 2018, Gaines was placed on injured reserve after being diagnosed with his second concussion in three weeks.

=== Buffalo Bills (second stint) ===
On March 25, 2019, Gaines signed a one-year contract with the Bills. He was placed on injured reserve on August 10, 2019 with a core muscle injury. He was released on August 18.

On April 1, 2020, Gaines signed a one-year contract to return to the Bills.

On August 2, 2020, Bills general manager Brandon Beane announced that Gaines would opt out of the 2020 season due to the COVID-19 pandemic. He was waived after the season on January 29, 2021.

== NFL career statistics ==
Legend
**Bold**	Career high

=== Regular season ===
Year	Team	Games		Tackles					Interceptions					Fumbles			
Year	Team	GP	GS	Cmb	Solo	Ast	Sck	TFL	Int	Yds	TD	Lng	PD	FF	FR	Yds	TD
2014	STL	15	15	**70**	**63**	7	0.0	**3**	**2**	0	0	0	**14**	0	**2**	0	0
2016	LAR	11	10	56	47	9	0.0	0	0	0	0	0	7	1	1	0	0
2017	BUF	11	11	59	48	**11**	0.0	0	1	**1**	0	**1**	9	**3**	0	0	0
2018	CLE	6	2	13	11	2	0.0	1	1	0	0	0	3	0	0	0	0
		43	38	198	169	29	0.0	4	4	1	0	1	33	4	3	0	0

=== Postseason ===
Year	Team	Games		Tackles					Interceptions					Fumbles			
Year	Team	GP	GS	Cmb	Solo	Ast	Sck	TFL	Int	Yds	TD	Lng	PD	FF	FR	Yds	TD
2017	BUF	1	1	2	1	1	0.0	0	0	0	0	0	0	0	0	0	0
		1	1	2	1	1	0.0	0	0	0	0	0	0	0	0	0	0

== Personal life ==
Edwin "EJ" Gaines was born to Edwin Gaines Sr. and Alta Bailey. He is the youngest of five and only son. His siblings are as follows: Nashun Wilson, Desiree Bailey, Danielle Gaines, and Tina Gaines.

Gaines brought forth his first child, Edwin "Tre" Gaines III, with Juanita Clare on January 23, 2016. The couple welcomed their second child, Juliana Gaines, July 8, 2018, and their third, Ellius Gaines, December 15, 2019.
