= Ziah Town =

Town in River Gee County, Liberia

Coordinates: 5°46′N 7°51′W

Ziah Town is a town in Grand Gedeh County, southeastern Liberia. It serves as the administrative seat of Konobo District. The majority of the residents are ethnic Krahn and many use its language on a daily basis. It is now classified as a city, with about 3,000 people living there from Konobo, Glio, Twabo putu and sometimes Glaro (the area used to be part of grand Gedeh county, now River Gee).
