= Lagesen =

Lagesen is a Norwegian surname. Notable people with the surname include:

- Alf Lagesen (1897–1973), Norwegian footballer
- Kai Lagesen (born 1965), Norwegian footballer
- Ruth Lagesen (1914–2005), Norwegian pianist and conductor
