= Conservation International Liberia =

Country programme of Conservation International in Liberia

- Abbreviation: CI Liberia
- Formation: 2001
- Type: Country programme
- Headquarters: Monrovia, Liberia
- Region served: Liberia
- Fields: Biodiversity conservation; protected areas; sustainable landscapes
- Parent organization: Conservation International
- Website: www.conservation.org/places/liberia

Conservation International Liberia (CI Liberia) is the Liberia country programme of Conservation International. Conservation International began working in Liberia in 2001.

Its work in Liberia has included protected-area and forest landscape conservation, coastal and marine programmes, conservation finance, and sustainable production initiatives in commodity landscapes. Conservation finance initiatives linked to its work have included the Liberia Conservation Fund, while conservation agreements around East Nimba Nature Reserve linked forest-conservation actions to livelihood benefits.

== Overview ==
CI Liberia works across forest, coastal, and production landscapes in Liberia. Its programme areas have included support for protected-area management and ecological connectivity in southeastern Liberia, conservation agreements linked to biodiversity protection and community livelihoods around East Nimba Nature Reserve, coastal and marine conservation through the Blue Oceans Programme and mangrove-focused natural capital accounting, and the FOLUR project in northwest Liberia aimed at reducing deforestation, restoring degraded lands, and supporting deforestation-free cocoa and palm oil value chains. Conservation finance linked to its work has included the Liberia Conservation Fund, launched in 2018 as an independent mechanism intended to provide long-term financing for Liberia's protected areas.

== History ==
Conservation International began working in Liberia in 2001 and established a country programme based in Monrovia.

An early milestone in its research work came in 2007, when its Rapid Assessment Program published a rapid biological assessment of North Lorma, Gola and Grebo National Forests in Liberia.

In May 2018, Conservation International and the Government of Liberia launched the Liberia Conservation Fund as an independent fund intended to provide long-term financing for the country's protected areas. In March 2019, it also helped convene the Blue Oceans Conference in Monrovia, which was followed later that year by the Blue Oceans Programme, a Sweden-funded coastal and marine initiative covering Liberia's coastline from December 2019 to December 2026.

In February 2020, Conservation International and Liberian partner agencies began a Global Environment Facility project on conservation and sustainable use of Liberia's coastal natural capital, centred on natural capital accounting, coastal ecosystem management, and related financing mechanisms.

In the 2020s, Conservation International served as the implementing agency for the Liberia component of the Global Environment Facility Food Systems, Land Use and Restoration (FOLUR) Impact Program in the northwest landscape, focused on reducing deforestation from cocoa and palm oil value chains and restoring degraded lands.

== Programmes and operations ==
Selected programme locations mentioned in the article (1 Monrovia, 2 Sapo National Park, 3 Grebo-Krahn National Park, 4 East Nimba Nature Reserve, 5 Lofa County (FOLUR Northwest Landscape))

=== Coastal and marine conservation ===
In March 2019, the Government of Liberia, the Embassy of Sweden in Monrovia and Conservation International convened the Blue Oceans Conference in Monrovia. The Blue Oceans Programme was developed as a follow-up to that conference and, with Swedish funding, covered Liberia's coastline from December 2019 to December 2026. Its overall aims included sustainable management of Liberia's marine ecosystem, blue economic development, action on marine pollution, and support for small-scale fisheries. Strategic objectives included stronger coastal and marine resource management, improved response to marine plastic pollution, greater climate resilience for coastal communities and ecosystems, sustainable management of small-scale fisheries, and stronger institutional capacity and coordination. A 2023 amendment expanded the programme to include mangrove protection and alternative livelihood options for coastal communities, and planned activities included a first national mangrove inventory, community mangrove management committees and plans, alternative fish-preservation methods intended to reduce mangrove use, and financial incentives for fishing communities.

Conservation International has also worked with Liberian agencies on the GEF-funded project Conservation and sustainable use of Liberia's coastal natural capital. Begun in February 2020, the project was implemented through the Environmental Protection Agency in partnership with the Liberia Maritime Authority, the Liberia Institute of Statistics and Geo-Information Services, the Ministry of Finance and Development Planning, and the Forestry Development Authority. Its objective was to improve conservation and sustainable use of Liberia's coastal natural capital by mainstreaming the value of nature into national development. The project used natural capital accounting in coastal ecosystems, including the System of Environmental-Economic Accounting and ecosystem accounting frameworks, and included development of Liberia's first mangrove account within a natural capital accounting framework. The Forestry Development Authority has also used a national mangrove dataset from Conservation International in land-cover mapping work, including mangrove mapping based on Landsat 8 imagery from late 2014 and early 2015.

=== Southeast Liberia (Tai–Grebo–Sapo landscape) ===
Work in southeastern Liberia has been framed within the Tai–Grebo–Sapo landscape, a transboundary forest complex extending across southeastern Liberia and southwestern Côte d'Ivoire. The landscape links Taï National Park in Côte d'Ivoire with Sapo National Park and Grebo-Krahn National Park in Liberia, and cross-border collaboration has been treated as a central tool for management planning, implementation and monitoring. A bilateral steering committee for the landscape was launched in 2009 and has met regularly since 2013. Major shared pressures have included forest degradation and fragmentation, unsustainable resource use, agricultural expansion, illegal cross-border migration, and trade in wildlife and other illegally obtained products.

Grebo-Krahn National Park was gazetted on 22 August 2017 and formally launched in 2018. Located on Liberia's border with Côte d'Ivoire, with the Cavalla River forming much of its eastern boundary, the park was established for its biodiversity values and transboundary importance within the Tai–Grebo–Sapo complex. Its border location has been identified as crucial for maintaining continuous forest cover between Taï National Park and Sapo National Park and for enabling wildlife movement across the transboundary landscape. In the Tai–Grebo–Sapo programme, support included participatory development of the park's management plan, approved in December 2021, and further work to strengthen monitoring and law enforcement.

Sapo National Park, created in 1983 and expanded in 2003, is Liberia's oldest and largest protected area and the second-largest area of primary tropical rainforest in West Africa after Taï National Park. Its management plan places the park in the middle of Liberia's southeastern forest network and treats effective management as important for protecting rare and endemic species, maintaining corridor connectivity, and improving benefits for adjacent communities. Earlier Community Development Committees jointly established by the Forestry Development Authority, Fauna & Flora International, and Conservation International were used as proxy liaison groups; the revised plan proposed a Community Advisory Body to strengthen community engagement in park management. The plan states that implementation funding was expected to come from government budget allocations, donor support, and, potentially, fees from ecotourism activities.

=== East Nimba Nature Reserve ===
East Nimba Nature Reserve was established in 2003. A co-management agreement was signed in 2010 between the Forestry Development Authority and communities represented through a Joint Forest Management Committee, and a management plan developed in 2013 with Fauna & Flora International, ArcelorMittal Liberia, and Conservation International was endorsed in March 2014.

Co-management has been a central part of the reserve's governance framework. With support from USAID and Conservation International, representatives of government, community bodies, local and international non-governmental organisations, and private-sector actors met in October 2022 to review the work of the Co-Management Committee and renew the agreement. The revised agreement, signed in December 2022, clarified the committee's operational structure, the rights and obligations of the committee and the Forestry Development Authority, and provisions on financial transparency.

=== Northwest Liberia (FOLUR landscape) ===
CI Liberia, in collaboration with the Environmental Protection Agency, implements the Global Environment Facility Food Systems, Land Use and Restoration (FOLUR) project in the northwest Liberia landscape. The project covers about 2.5 million hectares in Bong, Bomi, Gbarpolu, Grand Cape Mount, and Lofa counties, and is carried out in partnership with Fauna & Flora International, the Royal Society for the Protection of Birds, and the Society for the Conservation of Nature of Liberia. It is focused on land-use planning, restoration of degraded lands, biodiversity conservation, and governance, policy, and market incentives intended to support nationally replicable models of deforestation-free cocoa and palm oil value chains.

The programme is structured around four components: development, adoption, and implementation of national and landscape land-use plans; promotion of sustainable production practices for food crops, cocoa, and palm oil through responsible value chains; biodiversity loss reduction and restoration of natural habitats; and coordination, collaboration, and monitoring and evaluation. It also works with local communities, government agencies, and private-sector actors including Mano Palm Oil Industries Inc.

Selected landscapes and activity contexts related to Conservation International Liberia
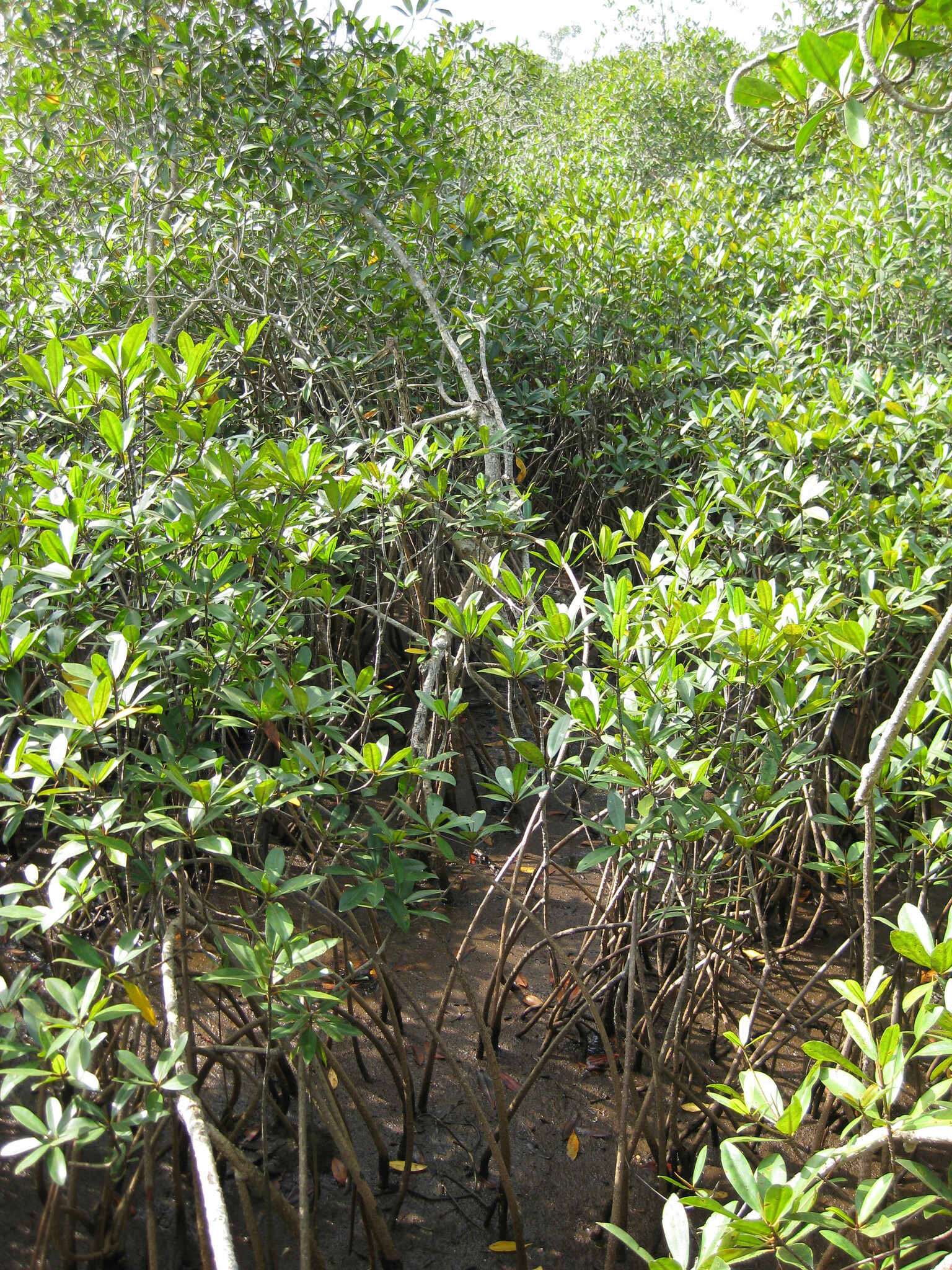
Mangroves near Marshall, representative of coastal ecosystems addressed in CI Liberia's coastal natural-capital and Blue Oceans work

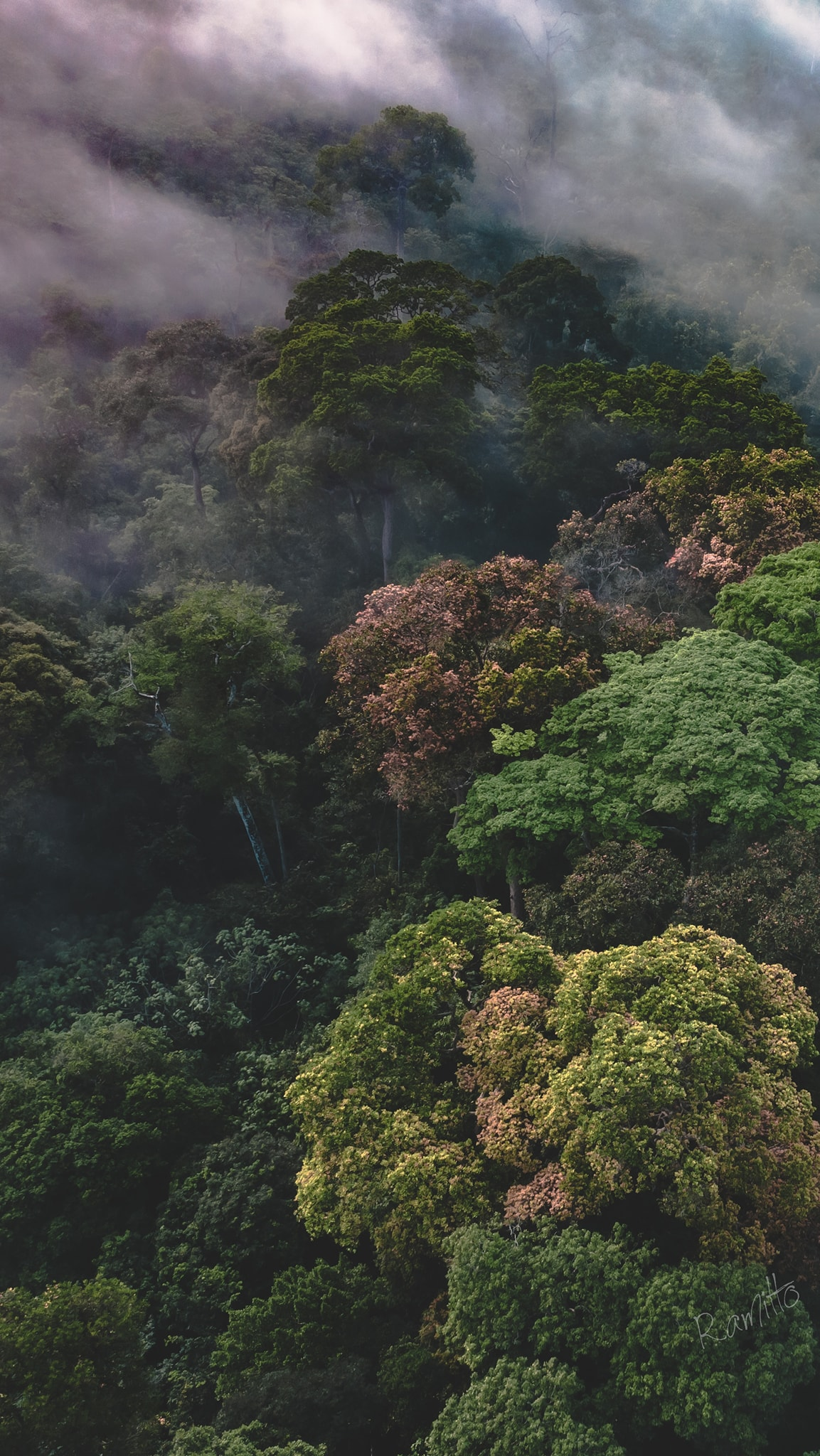
Forest in River Gee County, southeastern Liberia

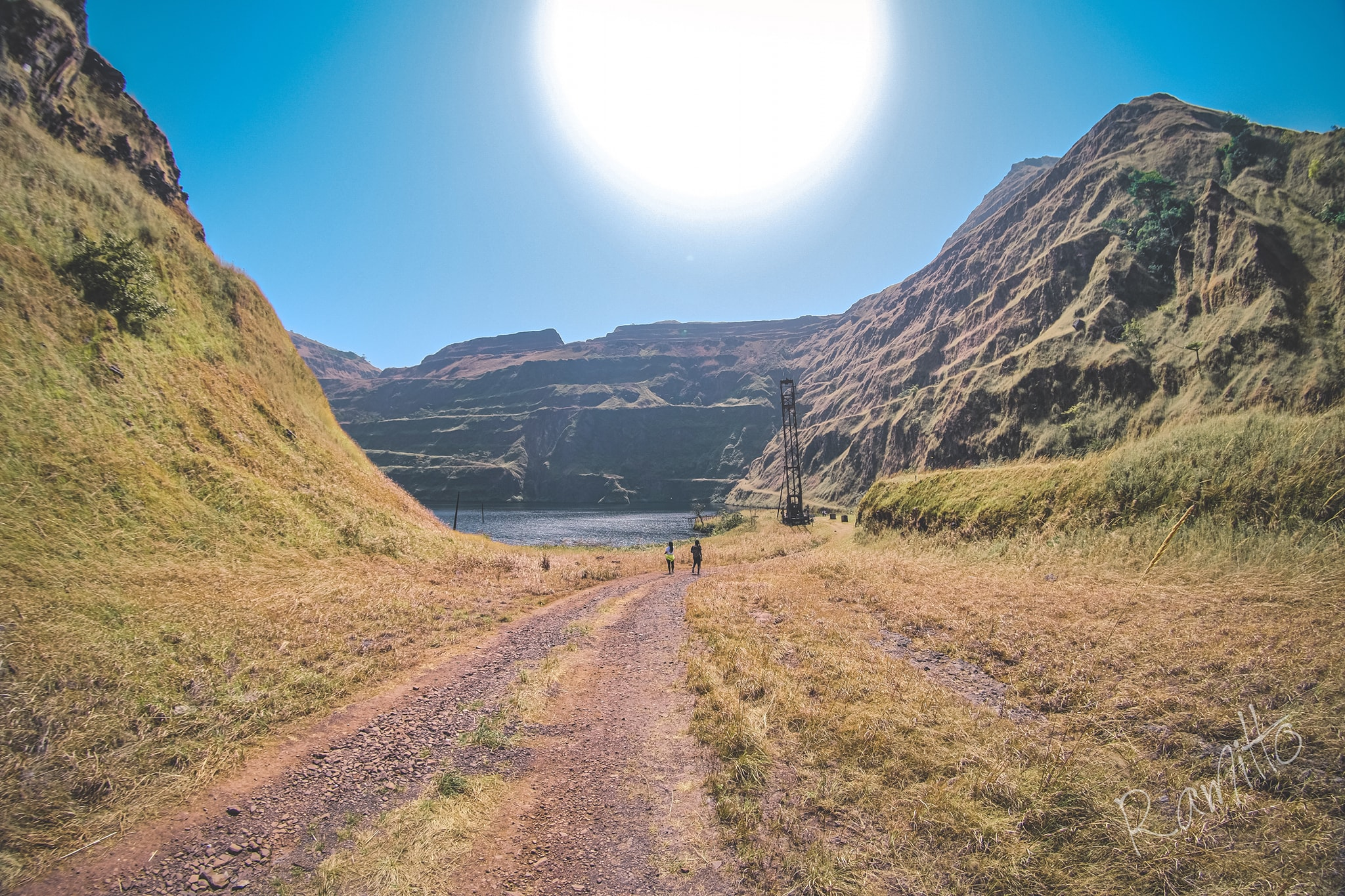
Mount Nimba in Nimba County, providing geographic context for the East Nimba landscape

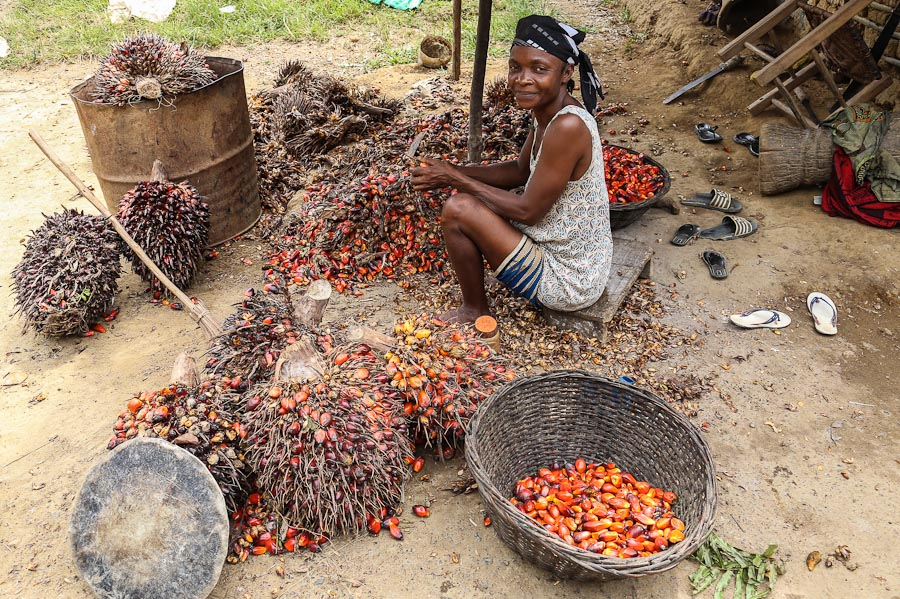
Oil-palm nuts in Liberia, a commodity context for the FOLUR project's focus on deforestation-free palm-oil value chains

== Partnerships ==
CI Liberia's work has involved repeated partnerships with Liberian public institutions in protected-area management, coastal governance, and conservation finance. Recurring state and regional partners have included the Forestry Development Authority in protected-area management and the Liberia Conservation Fund, the Environmental Protection Agency in the northwest FOLUR landscape and coastal natural capital work, the Liberia Maritime Authority, the Liberia Institute of Statistics and Geo-Information Services, and the Ministry of Finance and Development Planning in coastal natural capital accounting, and the Mano River Union in transboundary ecosystem planning in southeastern Liberia.

International and non-state partners have included Sweden through the Blue Oceans Programme; Fauna & Flora International in East Nimba and community-engagement structures around Sapo National Park; ArcelorMittal Liberia around East Nimba Nature Reserve; and, in the northwest landscape, the Royal Society for the Protection of Birds and the Society for the Conservation of Nature of Liberia. Community-based partner structures have included the Joint Forest Management Committee around East Nimba and Community Development Committees around Sapo National Park.

== Funding and conservation finance ==
Conservation finance linked to CI Liberia's work has taken several forms, including trust-fund finance for protected areas, performance-based community benefit-sharing agreements, sustainable commodity finance in agricultural landscapes, and coastal conservation finance.

The Liberia Conservation Fund was launched in May 2018 by Conservation International and the Government of Liberia as a national mechanism intended to provide sustainable, long-term financing for Liberia's protected areas. It was launched with an initial commitment of US$1 million from Conservation International's Global Conservation Fund, with additional pledges from the Government of Liberia through the Forestry Development Authority, and was intended to direct multiple conservation finance sources through endowments supporting individual protected areas around the country. By 2019, the fund was treated as a promising mechanism for improving the financial sustainability of at least some of Liberia's protected areas, and by project completion in 2023 its governance structure and fund-raising capability had been strengthened. The fund was also listed among funding mechanisms for Sapo National Park.

Around East Nimba Nature Reserve, conservation agreements were used as a subnational benefit-sharing mechanism linking specific forest-conservation actions to performance-based livelihood benefits. The first agreements were signed in 2015 with eight communities east and west of the reserve, and the mechanism was presented as a way to support conservation through productive investments and local livelihood improvement.

In the northwest Liberia landscape, the FOLUR project linked land-use planning and restoration work to governance, policy, fiscal, financial, and trade measures intended to support deforestation-free cocoa and palm oil value chains. Landscape finance mechanisms, including payment for ecosystem services, were also explored in the region.

In coastal Liberia, the natural capital accounting project linked ecosystem accounting to innovative financing schemes for mangrove and coastal ecosystem management. Identified mechanisms included tourism-related taxes and fees, debt-for-nature swaps, conservation trust funds, and payments for environmental services, alongside a performance-based system of community incentives for local stewardship of coastal natural capital.

== Impact and evaluation ==
In completion reporting and later validation, the Liberia Forest Sector Project received a Moderately Satisfactory outcome rating, and performance after the 2018 restructuring was assessed as substantially improved despite moderate shortcomings in efficiency. By June 2023, 415,204 hectares of protected areas were under effective management and 542,292 hectares were under sustainable landscape management, although both totals fell short of target levels. Management Effectiveness Tracking Tool scores exceeded revised end-of-project targets in Sapo National Park, Lake Piso Multiple Use Reserve, Wonegizi Nature Reserve, and Gola Forest National Park.

Beneficiary survey results were strongly positive. 86.5 percent of respondents said forest conservation had improved, 77.9 percent said the project had contributed to greater forest sustainability, and 72.7 percent said development pressures on forests had declined. In addition, 57.8 percent of respondents reported improved household incomes and 99.6 percent said they had received at least some benefit from project activities.

The evaluation also identified important limitations. Efficiency was rated Modest because implementation took seven years rather than four, disbursement remained low before restructuring, and management and communications spending exceeded the original allocation. Ex post monetary benefits were lower than total project costs, and monitoring data available through 2021 indicated increased forest degradation relative to the 2013–2017 baseline in the southeastern landscape. Risks to continuity were also identified after project closing, including funding gaps for the RIU and the monitoring, reporting, and verification team, dismissal of some project-supported staff in the Forestry Development Authority and Environmental Protection Agency, and the need for continued data collection and technical capacity to sustain results and advance the REDD+ process.
