= Rolf Tophoven =

German journalist and terrorism expert (born 1937)

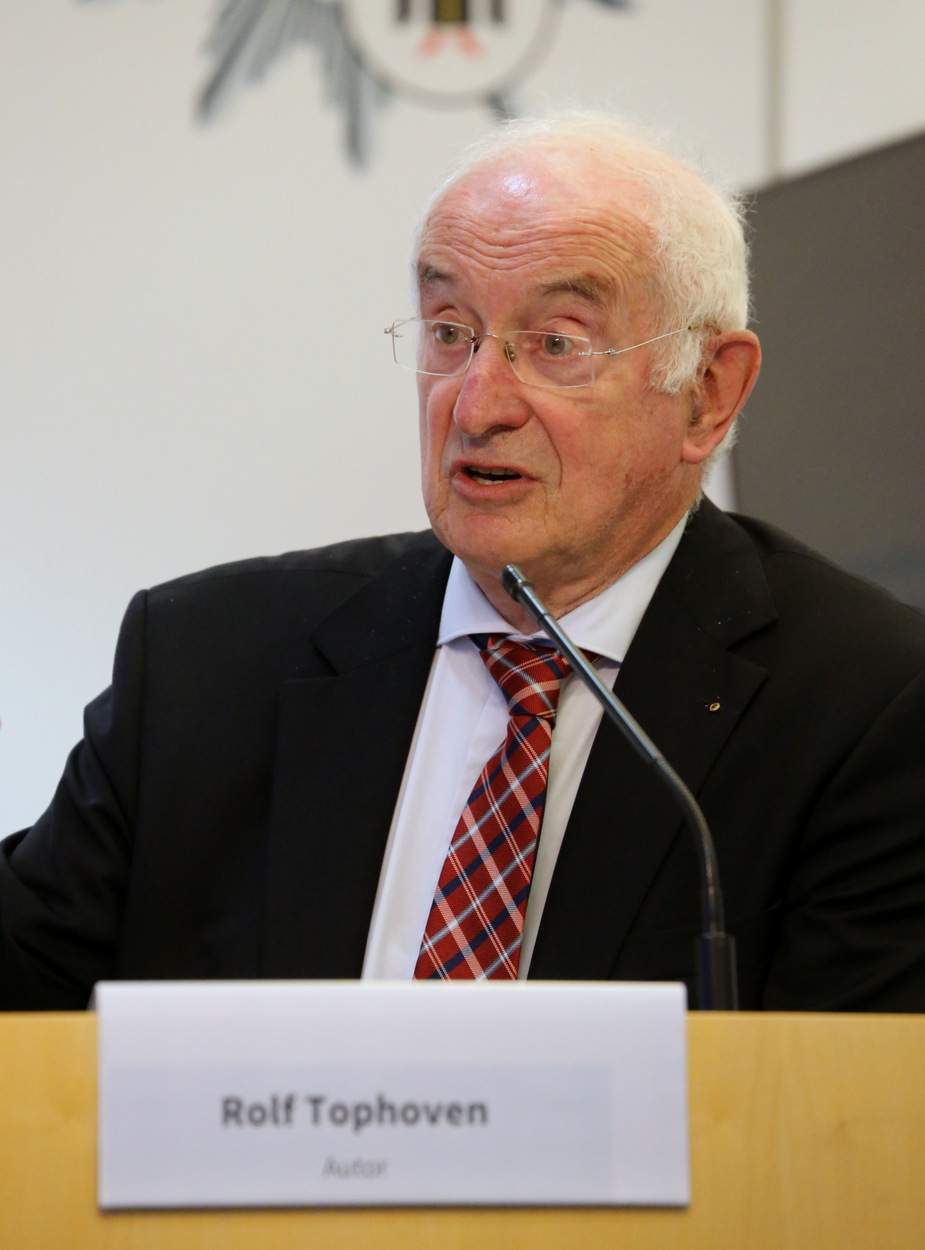
Image of Rolf Tophoven

Rolf Tophoven (born 1937) is a German journalist and terrorism expert.

== Biography ==
Tophoven studied German Philology and Historical Science at the University of Münster, with focus on military and guerilla history. He was a member of a catholic student fraternity. Afterwards he was a teacher of history, politics and German language in Rheydt.

Along with Hans Josef Horchem, former chief of Verfassungsschutz in Hamburg, Tophoven was vice director from 1986 of the Institut für Terrorismusforschung in Bonn (Institute for Terrorism Research) until its dissolution in 1993. It was re-founded by Tophoven in Essen as Institut für Terrorismusforschung und Sicherheitspolitik (Institute for Terrorism Research and Security Policy) on 11 September 2003.

Tophoven lives in Grefrath.

== Research ==
Tophoven is known as an expert in terrorism and security policy. He published newspaper articles for Die Welt, as well as books about the Middle East conflicts, the GSG 9, the war in Chechnya, and about militant Islamism.

== Books ==
- Fedayin. Guerilla ohne Grenzen, München 1975
- Politik durch Gewalt. Guerilla und Terrorismus heute, Bonn 1976
- GSG 9. Kommando gegen Terrorismus Bonn 1977, ISBN 3-7637-5445-8
- Terrorismus und Guerilla, Berlin 1982, ISBN 3-590-54809-6
- Sterben für Allah. Die Schiiten und der Terrorismus, Düsseldorf 1993, ISBN 3-612-26038-3
- Der israelisch-arabische Konflikt, Bonn 1999
- Das Terrorismus-Lexikon. Täter, Opfer und Hintergründe, along with Kai Hirschmann and Wilhelm Dietl, Frankfurt am Main 2006, ISBN 978-3-8218-5642-1
- Der Nahost-Konflikt. Dokumente, Kommentare und Meinungen, with Kinan Jaeger, Bonn 2011
- Rainer Glatz. Rolf Tophoven (ed.). Am Hindukusch – und weiter? Die Bundeswehr im Auslandseinsatz: Erfahrungen, Bilanzen, Ausblicke.
- Der "Islamische Staat": Geschlagen, nicht besiegt. Herausforderung und Abwehr. Schriftenreihe der Bundeszentrale für politische Bildung Band 10571, Bonn 2020, ISBN 978-3-7425-0571-2.
