= Frobel =

Frobel, Fröbel, or Froebel may refer to:

== People ==
- Doug Frobel (born 1959), major league baseball player
- Friedrich Fröbel (1782–1852), German (Thuringian) pedagogue who laid the foundation for modern education
- Karl Friedrich Fröbel (1807-1894), German pedagogue, nephew of Friedrich Fröbel
- Luise Fröbel (1815–1900), German pedagogue, wife of Friedrich Fröbel
- Julius Fröbel (1805–1893), German geologist and mineralogist, journalist, and democratic revolutionary
- Kai Frobel, German environmental ecologist

== Other uses ==
- 10835 Fröbel, a main belt asteroid named after Friedrich Fröbel
- Froebel star, one of many names of a Christmas decoration made of paper, named after Friedrich Fröbel
- The German name of Wróblin, Opole Voivodeship, Poland
