= Aud Gustad =

Norwegian trade unionist and politician (1917–2000)

Aud Solveig Gustad, née Lund Olsen (1 May 1917 – 30 April 2000) was a Norwegian trade unionist and politician for the Communist and Socialist Left parties.

She was born in Trondheim as a daughter of worker Jens Valdemar Lund Olsen (1894–1970) and cleaner Jenny Oline Emilie Hansen (1896–1966). She was active in the Norwegian communists' pioneer movement from 1930, and from 1935 to 1939 she was active in the Young Communist League of Norway. She finished her secondary education at Trondheim Cathedral School in 1937 and started as a journalist in Ny Tid in the same year. After a stint as telephone worker from 1938 until 1944 she briefly returned to Ny Tid in 1945. The Second World War was over, and she briefly served in the Communist Party women's committee.

In 1939 she had married worker Helge Kristian Gustad. She left the workforce for some years, but was hired as a receptionist in Phoenix Hotell in 1951. In 1955 she went on to become a bookkeeper for Bladcentralen. Here she was elected as the local union leader (Union of Employees in Commerce and Offices) in 1961. From 1969 to 1970 she changed job to assistant at the Social School, and chaired the Trondheim branch of the progressive women's league Norsk Kvinneforbund. From 1970 to 1977 she was a secretary in the Norwegian Heart and Lung Patient Organization regionally.

In the 1971 Norwegian local elections Gustad was elected as a deputy member of Trondheim city council; and full member in 1975. In the meantime she had become a deputy representative to the Parliament of Norway from Sør-Trøndelag, elected in 1973. After a little less than two years, the regular representative Kai Øverland died and Gustad replaced him. He took a seat in the Standing Committee on Standing Committee on Social Affairs.

In 1977 she withdrew from electoral politics to move to Oslo and work as a secretary for the Norwegian Heart and Lung Patient Organization nationwide. From 1984 to 1991 she was a board member of the Norwegian Federation of Organisations of Disabled People. However, she served as a bnational board member of the Socialist Left Party from 1979 to 1981 and member of their committee on social policy from 1979 to 1983. She was also a deputy board member of Postverket from 1977 to 1981.
