= Zwedru =

Zwedru Tchien
- Location in Liberia
- Coordinates: 6°04′N 8°08′W
- Country: Liberia
- County: Grand Gedeh County
- District: Tchien District

Population (2008)
  - Total: 23,903
- Climate: Am

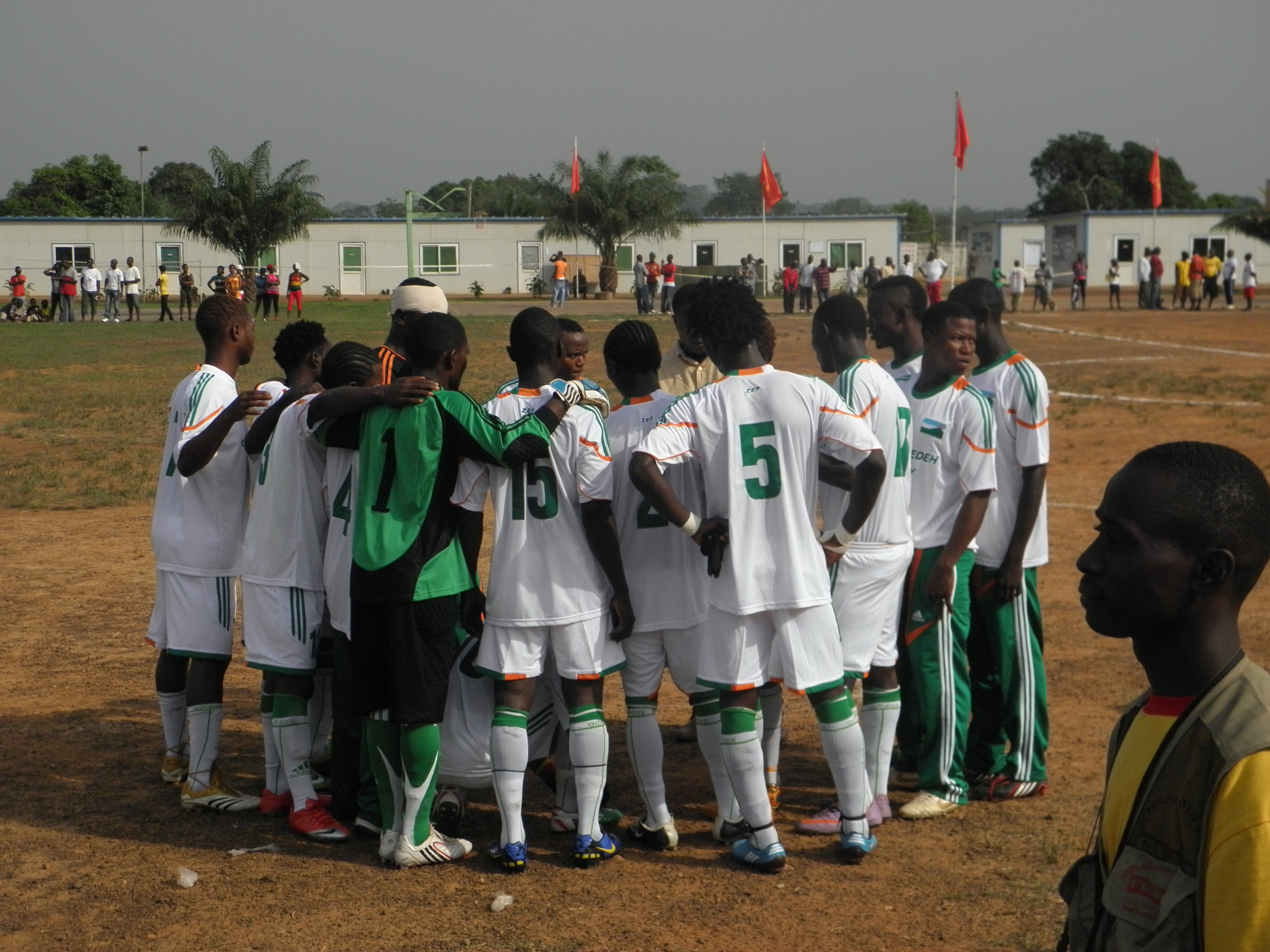
Grand Gedeh County soccer team at the Albert T. White sports stadium in Zwedru

Zwedru is the capital of Grand Gedeh County, one of the 15 counties in Liberia. Zwedru is located in Tchien District of Grand Gedeh County, near the Cavalla River in the country's south-eastern region and near the border with Costa de Marfil. It is located 435 km (270 miles) southeast from the capital city of Monrovia. The town is a stronghold of the Krahn tribe.

The town gets its name after the head of a local anteater creek. Zwedru is surrounded by a lot of forests, and lies in a tropical region. The north-western section of Zwedru has an important forest region with rare bird species.

Before the Liberian Civil War, Zwedru was known for timber production and its wood products industry. As of the 2008 census, Zwedru has a population of 23,903 making it the largest settlement east of Cestos River. Of this, 11,828 were male and 12,075 female. Zwedru residents are mainly Krahn, Mandingo, Grebo, Fulani and Gio and Mano tribes.

Zwedru is the largest metropolis in the southeast and is the key inland transportation center in the region. The intersection of the two main highways linking the 5 counties in the region lies some 13 km (8 miles) southwest of the city. The William D. Coleman Airfield with its gravel-surfaced runway, lies within the city limits and provides only domestic services. Zwedru, like its host county, is landlocked and has no form of water transport. The city is well planned, with some claiming it to have the best road system outside Montserrado County. Motorcycles, locally called penpen, provide transport for most of the people. Trucks transport bulk of the goods that enter the city from Monrovia or Guinea.

Communication in the city has made significant progress as seen in the media sector where few radio stations have erected in post war era. There are 3 FM radio stations that serve the city and there is no domestic Television service. Smile FM is the oldest radio station in Zwedru and is the only community run media institution. Top FM and Flash FM are the other two and are under private operations. The state own broadcasting TV network does not reach the city due to its low range coverage. A newspaper recently began publishing in the area. Liberia's two main GSM companies Lonestar and Orange all have steel towers in Zwedru.

As the main population center in the county and the region as a whole, Zwedru has many entertainment centers, Hotels, Motels and Guest Houses.

There are 10 high schools (3 public and 7 private) in the city and several primary schools mainly operated by churches and other private groups. The 10 diploma and national examination certificate offering institutions are (public): The Zwedru Multilateral High School, Tubman Wilson Institute, Suah Memorial High School; (private): Robert Baker Richardson Baptist High School, M. Nixon Garlo Evangelical Lutheran High School, Bishop Juwle High School, Zwedru United Methodist High School, Salvation Army High School, Mike Tula Wilson AG School and Solid Foundation High School recently established in 2009. The only campus of the Grand Gedeh County Community College is situated on the outskirts of the city in the Garloville area.

== History ==
Zwedru is best known for the birthplace of former 21st president of Liberia, Samuel Doe. After taking power in a bloody coup d’état in 1980, he installed a number of pavements and also constructed a mansion on the edge of town but he did not live there even for a night until 9 September 1990, when he was captured, tortured and murdered by rebels at a military base in Monrovia.
