= Liu Kai =

Liu Kai is the name of:

- Liu Kai (Song dynasty) (947–1000), Song dynasty politician and scholar
- Liu Kai (baseball) (born 1987), Chinese baseball player

== See also ==
- Liu Kang (artist) (born Liu Kai; 1911–2004), Singaporean artist
