= Grebo-Krahn National Park =

National Park in Liberia

- Location within Liberia
- Interactive map of Grebo-Krahn National Park

Geography
- Location: Grand Gedeh County and River Gee County, Liberia
- Coordinates: 5°31′19″N 7°37′12″W
- Elevation: 200 m (660 ft)
- Area: 237,591.55 acres (96,149.89 ha) (official land area); 693,377.7 acres (280,600.0 ha) (maximum extent of combined forest cover)

Administration
- Status: State-owned
- Established: October 9, 2017
- Authority: Forestry Development Authority

Ecology
- Forest cover: >99%

Grebo-Krahn National Park, Grebo-Krahn National Forest, Grebo National Park, Grebo National Forest, or Grebo Forest is a national park in Grand Gedeh County and River Gee County, Liberia controlled by Liberia's Forestry Development Authority.

== Environment ==
The park contains over 300 animal species, 270 plant species and serves as an important habitat for endangered and critically endangered species and subspecies, most notably the western chimpanzee, Diana monkey, king colobus, pygmy hippopotamus and giant pangolin The park has also been designated an Important Bird Area (IBA) by BirdLife International because it supports significant populations of many bird species. Conservation work in the wider Grebo forest landscape has included activities by Conservation International Liberia.
