= Pasi Arvonen =

Finnish ice hockey coach

- Born: February 5, 1968 (age 57); Hämeenlinna, Finland
- Occupation(s): Head Coach, HPK
- Predecessor: Kai Rautio

Pasi Arvonen (born February 5, 1968) is a Finnish ice hockey coach. He is currently the head coach for HPK of the Finnish Liiga.

On October 14, 2013, Arvonen replaced Kai Rautio to take over the head coaching duties for HPK.
