= Konobo District =

Coordinates: 5.759°N 7.875°W

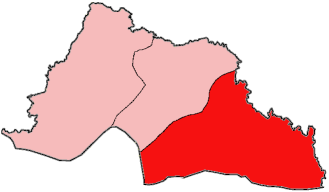
Location of Konobo District in Grand Gedeh County

Konobo District is one of three districts located in Grand Gedeh County, Liberia. The administrative seat of the District is Ziah Town. As of 2008, the District had 50,161 people making it the second most populated in Grand Gedeh County next to Gbarzon District. In area, it is about 1,400 square miles (3,600 km^{2}).

There are several gold mines particularly in the eastern belt of which the CVI mining camps of New Creek, Solo Camp and Belleh Yallah are the most renowned areas of significant production. Mining, small scale farming and hunting are the main source of income for bulk of the population. Remittances especially from U.S. based families are reliable income for some residents. The District only has one high school in Ziah Town and few deports of the Liberia National Police.

In 2012, the Liberian government arrested and is still detaining several suspected men from the District and other parts of Grand Gedeh accused of cross border raids which left seven Niger UN peacekeepers and 8 Civilians dead in neighboring Coted'Ivoire. The men and vast number of the district residents continue to plead non involvement in such act and many of them have repeatedly accused Monrovia of discriminatory treatment against the Krahn ethnic group where former president Samuel Doe hailed from.

Infrastructure in the district is generally substandard and extremely bad especially for roads running in the tropical rainforest section of the District. Motorcycles are the popular and in some cases the only means of transport especially during the rainy season. Notable buildings are based mainly in Ziah Town, and they include the administrative building, a non-story building which houses the offices of the District superintendent and other officials, and the house of the mother of former president Samuel Doe. Road maintenance is carried out mainly by hand work particularly with cutlasses for side brushing and axe for removing logs thrown across by heavy storms or other features. The only well maintained road in the district is the Liberia national highway which runs through the District on its way to River Gee and Maryland counties.

The District is home to George Dweh Jr, former speaker of the National Transitional Legislative Assembly of Liberia(NTLA) between 2003 and early 2005, shortly before the 2005 general elections. The current Liberian lower house delegate from the District is Hon Marie Johnson who succeeded Hon George Boley in the 2023 general elections. Like many parts of Grand Gedeh, majority of the people are supporters of the ruling Coalition for Democratic Change (formerly Congress for Democratic Change) (CDC) as shown in the past 3 general elections where the District helped Grand Gedeh produced the party highest presidential percentage of any County until 2017 before Grand Kru County took over. Grand Gedeh County current superintendent, Kai G.Farley, a former member of the Liberian House of representatives who represented the District in parliament from 2006 to 2012 is member of the ruling party since 2005.

In January, 2018 Roland B. Kai was appointed superintendent of the District.

Chiefdoms of Konobo district: Konobo and Putu

Clans of Konobo chiefdom: Gbilibo-Gbalu and Glio-Twabo

Clans of Putu chiefdom: Gbaegbo and Jibehgbo
