= Roland B. Kai =

Liberian politician

Roland B. Kai is a Liberian politician and since 2018 the superintendent of Grand Gedeh's Konobo District.

== See also ==
- Politics of Liberia
