= Morais T. Waylee =

Liberian politician and lawyer

Morais Tarwuo Waylee (born 1955) is a Liberian politician and lawyer who represented Grand Gedeh's Konobo District in the Liberian House of Representatives from 2012 to 2018. He is a member of the Unity Party.
