= FieldLevel =

- Company type: Private
- Industry: Sport industry
- Founded: 2008
- Headquarters: Carlsbad
- Website: https://www.fieldlevel.com/

FieldLevel, Inc. is an athletic recruiting social network.

Athletes must be invited and by their current coaches in order to be searchable in the private database. College coaches have the option to search for athletes based on a number of different criteria, or can receive recommendations directly from high school and junior college coaches with which they are connected. FieldLevel is free for both athletes and coaches; it is not a formal "recruiting service," as determined by the NCAA.

FieldLevel operates in 46 sports and has helped facilitate over 165,000 college commitments since 2013.

== History ==
Founded in 2008 by Brenton Sullivan, Kai Sato, Cory Ducker, and Jeremy Weir, FieldLevel was the recipient of the "Best Undergraduate Business Plan" from the Lloyd Greif Center for Entrepreneurial Studies at the University of Southern California, and subsequently raised seed capital funding from Reid Dennis, founder of Institutional Venture Partners (IVP).

In 2009, FieldLevel was hired by the University of Southern California as the primary software provider for all athletic recruiting and NCAA compliance. In 2012, the company expanded their private network into baseball, football, basketball, lacrosse, and soccer.

In 2015, FieldLevel expanded into women's volleyball, its first female sport.

FieldLevel now supports the following 46 sports:

1. Baseball
2. Basketball (M)
3. Basketball (W)
4. Beach Volleyball (W)
5. Bowling (M)
6. Bowling (W)
7. Cross Country (M)
8. Cross Country (W)
9. Diving (M)
10. Diving (W)
11. Fencing (M)
12. Fencing (W)
13. Field Hockey (W)
14. Flag Football (W)
15. Football
16. Golf (M)
17. Golf (W)
18. Gymnastics (M)
19. Gymnastics (W)
20. Ice Hockey (M)
21. Ice Hockey (W)
22. Lacrosse (M)
23. Lacrosse (W)
24. Rifle (M)
25. Rifle (W)
26. Rowing (M)
27. Rowing (W)
28. Skiing - Alpine (M)
29. Skiing - Alpine (W)
30. Skiing - Nordic (M)
31. Skiing - Nordic (W)
32. Soccer (M)
33. Soccer (W)
34. Softball
35. Swimming (M)
36. Swimming (W)
37. Tennis (M)
38. Tennis (W)
39. Track & Field (M)
40. Track & Field (W)
41. Volleyball (M)
42. Volleyball (W)
43. Water Polo (M)
44. Water Polo (W)
45. Wrestling (M)
46. Wrestling (W)

== More References ==
1. Companies use smartphones to warn coaches of NCAA violations
2. How Future Star Athletes Are Being Discovered
