= Kai Tier =

Australian comedian

Kai Tier is a Melbourne-based standup comic/actor. After starting comedy in Brisbane in 2001, Kai moved to Perth and became the WA winner of Triple J's RAW Comedy in 2002. After graduating from WAAPA's Acting course in 2004 and moved to Melbourne at the end of that year. In 2005, his standup show Klamidia - The Musical premiered at the Melbourne comedy festival, which was followed by his 2006 show Kai Tier is Childhead, and his 2007 Melbourne Fringe Festival Show The Candidate. He now lives in Jersey City, New Jersey with his girlfriend LeeAnn and works at the tech company R/GA in New York City.
