= Liberia Institute of Statistics and Geo-Information Services =

Liberian government agency responsible for collecting and analyzing population data

Agency overview
- Jurisdiction: Government of Liberia
- Agency executive: Dr. T. Edward Liberty, Director General
- Website: http://www.lisgis.gov.lr/

The Liberia Institute of Statistics and Geo-Information Services (LISGIS) is an agency of the Liberian government. It organized a census in March 2008, 24 years after the last one.
