= Kai Rimmel =

Estonian politician

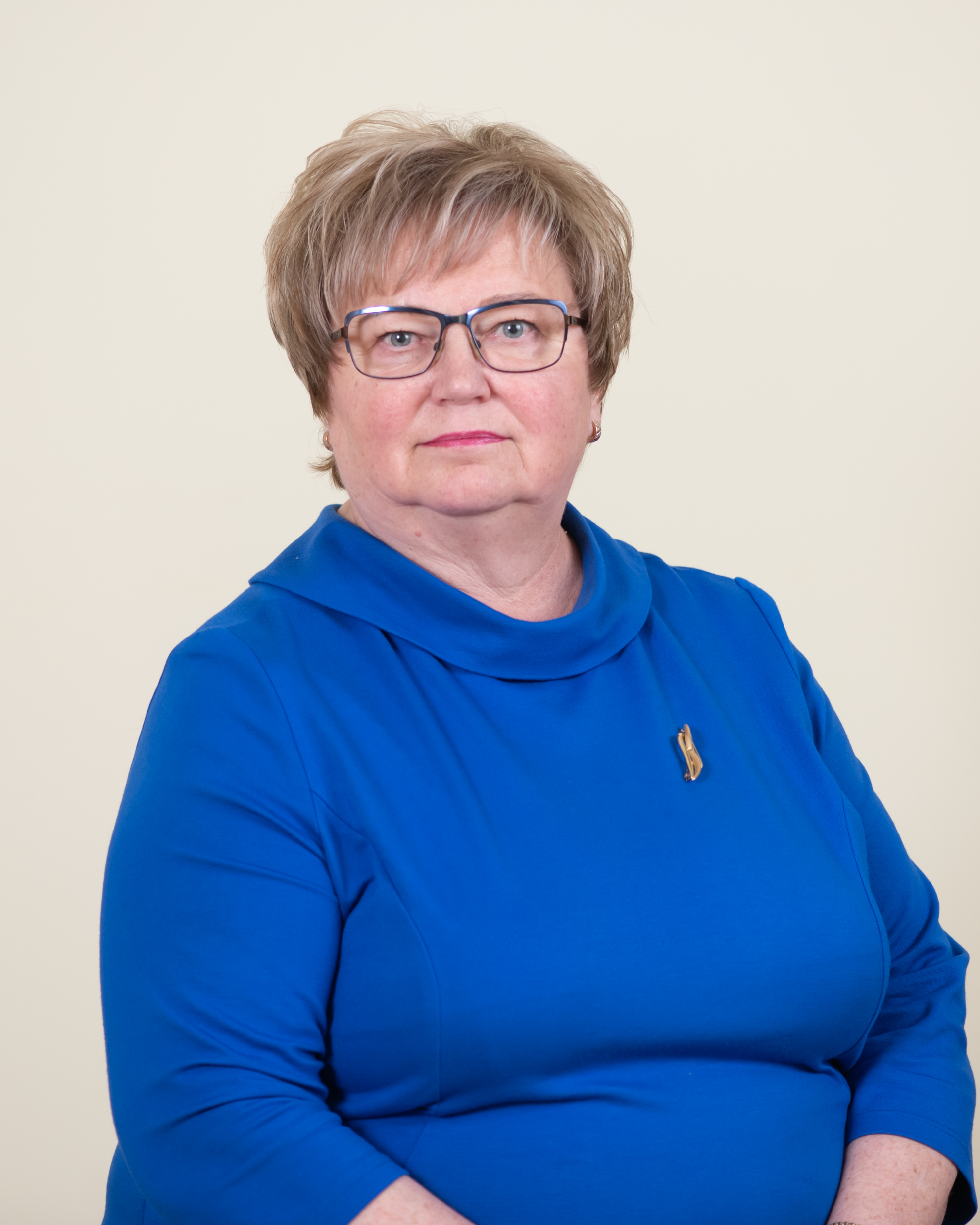
Kai Rimmel in 2019.

Kai Rimmel (born 23 November 1952 in Viljandi) is an Estonian politician. She was a member of the XIV Riigikogu.

In 1977 she graduated from Tallinn University of Technology with a degree in conservation technology.

From 1977 to 1986 she was an engineer-technologist in the Tallinn Model Poultry Factory/AS Tallegg.

Since 2006 she has been a member of the Conservative People's Party of Estonia.
