= Kai Altair =

American singer, songwriter

- Born: 1984 (age 40–41)
- Genres: Electronic rock
- Occupation(s): Singer, musician
- Website: Kaialtair.com

Kai Altair is an American singer-songwriter based in Brooklyn, New York. Altair attended the Manhattan School of Music and the Brooklyn Conservatory, and her style is influenced by dance culture, myth, storytelling, and dreams.

Altair's professional music career began with the founding of the electro rock band The Switch in 2004. She started a solo career in 2009, which began with the release of the EP Star of the Sea on October 31. Her first full-length album, "Dreamwalker", was released in June 2015.

Altair appeared in a Flambeaux Fire production of "The Calling" between 2010 and 2013; the show was a fire musical set in Brooklyn, starring Altair as a young witch on a journey through the spirit world.

Altair is the founder of the annual Mermaid Lagoon Ocean Benefit event, first held as a reaction to the Deepwater Horizon oil spill in the Gulf of Mexico in July 2010.
