= Kai Wessel =

Kai Wessel may refer to:

- Kai Wessel (countertenor), German countertenor
- Kai Wessel (director), German film director
