= Kai Øverland =

Norwegian politician (1931–1975)

Kai Øverland (27 February 1931 – 27 August 1975) was a Norwegian trade unionist and politician for the Socialist Left Party.

He was born in Trondheim, and took a vocational education. He worked as a plumber from 1947 to 1969, then as a surveyor for the Plumbers' Union in Trondheim. Øverland began his political career as a trade unionist, serving as secretary of the Plumbers' Union from 1958 to 1972. From 1961 to 1968 he chaired the Socialist People's Party in Trondheim as well as Sør-Trøndelag, and was a national board member. He was selected as board member of Trondheim Sporvei (1964–1971), and then elected to two terms in Trondheim city council from 1967 to 1975.

Øverland soon became a deputy member of the board Trondheim og Omegn Boligbyggelag (1968–1971) and Graakalbanen (1968–1971) and in the supervisory council of Fosen Trafikklag (1968–1974). He was a board member of Trondheim Trafikkselskap (1968–1973) and Trondheim og Omegn Boligbyggelag (1972–1973), and also chaired Trondheim Socialist People's Party for a second time from 1970 to 1973.

He went on to national politics as a representative to the Parliament of Norway from Sør-Trøndelag, elected in 1973. He took a seat in the Standing Committee on Standing Committee on Local Government and the Environment. After a mere 1 year and 331 days, he died and was replaced by partyfellow Aud Gustad.
