= Kai Hormann =

German computer scientist

- Born: September 1974; Lübeck, Germany
- Scientific career
- Fields: Computer Graphics
- Workplaces: Università della Svizzera italiana
- Website: www.inf.usi.ch/hormann/

Kai Hormann (born 1974) is a German computer scientist. He is professor of the faculty of Informatics at the Università della Svizzera italiana (USI), Switzerland. Hormann is the co-author of Efficient clipping of arbitrary polygons which describes the Greiner–Hormann clipping algorithm co-developed by him. The algorithm is known for being more performant than the Vatti clipping algorithm, but it cannot handle degeneracies. His research interests are inherent to the field of computer graphics. One of his notable collaborators in his researches is Vladimir Anisimoff's son Dmitry. He was Dean of the faculty of Informatics at USI from 2015 to 2017.
