= Kai Nielsen =

Kai Nielsen is the name of:

- Kai Nielsen (footballer)
- Kaj Nielsen (footballer)
- Kai Nielsen (sculptor) (1882–1924), Danish sculptor
- Kai Nielsen (philosopher) (1926–2021), American, Canada-based professor of philosophy
- Sixten Kai Nielsen (born 1978), Danish artist
- Kai Ewans, born Kai Nielsen, Danish jazz musician

== See also ==
- Kay Nielsen (1886–1957), Danish illustrator, pronounced Kai
