= Clare E. Steffen =

American psychologist and professor

- Clarissa Ellen Steffen
- Born: September 3, 1954 (age 72); Chicago, Illinois, United States
- Occupation: Psychologist

Academic background
- Education: University of San Francisco; San Jose State University; Saint Xavier University

Clarissa Ellen Steffen (born September 3, 1954) is an American psychologist and university professor.

== Early life and education ==
Steffen was born on September 3, 1954, in Chicago, Illinois.

Steffen graduated with a bachelor of arts in Education from Saint Xavier University in 1977 and completed her Masters in Therapeutic Recreation from San Jose State University. Steffen completed her Ed.D. in Counseling Educational Psychology from the University of San Francisco in 1987 and completed her N.D. in Naturopathy, Natural Health, and Herbology from Trinity College, Indiana.

== Career ==
Steffen is a psychologist who has practiced in California, Oregon, and Illinois, where she is licensed to practice in those states. Steffen's areas of expertise include substance use disorders, depression, anxiety, trauma, neuro-psychological conditions, and general mental health issues. She has published books such as Heal Your Brain: 90 Day Devotional and Live Your Life with Gratitude and Grace, through WestBow Press.

Steffen also previously practiced as a psychologist in Eugene, Oregon, where she focused on therapy, post-traumatic stress, recovery and prevention, anxiety and depression, family relationships, child custody, transgender and issues of human sexuality, and learning disabilities.

In September 2008, Steffen joined the University of Oregon as a SAPP Instructor/Counselor, where she served until 2015. She started Coaching Choice College in January 2011. In 2013, she joined the Bushnell University in Eugene, Oregon, as a Professor. She has also taught as a Professor in the Psychology department at Western Oregon University.

Steffen is also a musical composer. She started the "Round the Globe Project" through which she has collaborated on musical projects with people from more than 30 countries. To date, she has co-written over 30 albums through this project and has collaborated in 500 songs. Steffen has also co-written seven albums in diverse genres, including Country, Americana, Bluegrass, Celtic, Christmas, and Christian music. Together with a partner in Nashville, Tennessee, they publish under the name "Nashville Country."

== Publications ==
Clare has published several books, including Heal Your Brain: 90 Day Devotional, and a revised edition of Live Your Life with Gratitude and Grace, through WestBow Press.

Steffen's books and articles focus on concepts such as Cognitions of Choice, a philosophy for living that encourages the development of dispositional attributes, and The Big Five of Healthy Relationships, a model for improving communication and relationships.

Below is a list of publications by Clare Steffen:

Articles

- Message Music A Universal Genre
- Integrative Holistic Education: A Flexible Model to Meet the Needs of Students in Our Post-Modal Society
- Limitations of Sensory Systems (LOSS) Assessment
- Building a Foundation for Confidence Thinking in the Acquisition and Development of New Choices
- Universal Design and Cognitions of Choice: An Integrated Approach to Effective Substance Misuse Treatment Efforts
- Definition of Message Music. Retrieved from Facebook Group Description/About/Artist History
- Universal Design of Instruction and Cognitions of Choice: An Integrated Approach to Learning
- Effects of the 5Ws mnemonic on recall in head-injured adults

Working papers

- Integrative-Sustainability: A New Model for Wellness Psychology

Method

- Cognitions of Choice

Projects

- Cognitions of Choice
- Message Music: A Universal Genre
- Integrative-Sustainability: A New Model for Wellness Psychology (Question - Can We Effectively Apply Concepts of Sustainability to Counseling, Therapy, or Coaching?)

Data

- Cognitions of Choice posted in Common Knowledge
- How to Apply Cognitions of Choice
- Cognitions of Choice
