= Kai Starr =

American author (born 1964)

- Born: Kaichi Satake; September 25, 1964 (age 61); United States
- Occupations: Writer; artist; musician
- Writing career
- Period: 1980-today
- Genres: Western, Science Fiction, Fantasy, Supernatural
- Website: www.kaistarr.com

Kai Starr (real name Kaichi Satake) is an American author. He has written several books and drawn graphic novels in the science fiction and fantasy genres, but currently specializes in westerns. He is also a musician, and has recorded three albums of his original music. Kai Starr was raised in Texas and lives near Dallas.

His latest ongoing Desperado series of western novels and short stories have proved popular in internet serialization on his Outlaw Starr Anthology website. The serialized novels also have links to free MP3s of Starr's original music as soundtracks.

== Novels ==
=== ShadowFall Universe (science fiction) ===
Legends of Maragon takes place in the same universe as the ShadowFall series that stars Genjiro Nakadai, though it predates those stories by five hundred years. The series centers on the royal families of the alien world of Maragon.

- Legends of Maragon (fantasy) 1980

=== ShadowFall series (science fiction) ===
The ShadowFall series follows the life of a young ninjutsu agent, Genjiro Nakadai, through his early years in training to his days as a seasoned—and cynical--assassin. The first book in the series, Into the Abyss, was also presented in graphic novel format on the Kyoki Press website.

- Into the Abyss 1986
- Blood of the Ninja 1989
- The Faraian Conspiracy 1990
- A Covenant of Shadows 1992

=== Desperado series (western) ===
The Desperado series is set in the American Old West, from the late 1860s to the mid-1870s. It follows the life and adventures of young outlaw, Joshua Love. Though not written first, Rustler's Roundup is the first book in the series.

- Whirlwind 2006
- Three Ways From Sunday 2007
- Rustler's Roundup 2008
- Desperado Dawn 2008
- Justice Rides In Leather 2009

=== Short stories ===
- Mutual Desires (fantasy) 1987
- The Janus Factor (sci-fi) 1989
- The Little Dragon (sci-fi, ShadowFall series) 1990
- Rapture (sci-fi) 1992
- Rana's Adventure (fantasy) 1993
- The Ghost House (supernatural), 2000
- Down at the GoGozeNe Bar (sci-fi, ShadowFall series) 2004
- To Catch an Elf (fantasy) 2005
- Land Lubberin' Fer Love (fantasy) 2005
- The Ballad of the Beam (western, Desperado series) 2008
- Judas Hearts (western, Desperado series) 2008
- Rubbin' Eyeballs With a Gunn (western, Desperado series) 2008

=== Graphic novels ===
- ShadowFall 1998-2002 Kyoki Press (web publisher)
- The Wings of Cranes and Eagles 1999 Kyoki Press (web publisher)

== Albums ==
- Monochrome Heart 2007 DragonSong Records
- Raw 2008 DragonSong Records
- Desperado (Soundtrack) 2009 DragonSong Records
