= Kai Somerto =

Finnish diplomat

Kai David Somerto, until 1935 Sundsten (1925–1969) was a Finnish diplomat. He was a master of political science as education. He was a Finnish Ambassador to Mexico and Cuba from 1966 to 1969.

Somerto previously worked as a Secretary in Prague, and when Finland opened a delegation to Vienna in 1956, he took over the opening of the office with the title of temporary chargé d'affaires but was unlikely to be officially appointed.

Somerton's brother was the managing director of Association of Finnish Employers Pentti Somerto.
