= Kai Sato =

American entrepreneur (born 1984)

- Born: 1984 (age 41–42); Arizona, United States
- Education: University of Southern California
- Occupations: Business executive, entrepreneur, investor, and author

Kai Sato (born 1984) is an American business executive, entrepreneur, investor, and author. He is a general partner of Mauloa, a Maryland-based private equity firm. He is a fund advisor and the former entrepreneur-in-residence to Hatch, an aquaculture technology accelerator.

== Early life and education ==
Born in Arizona, Sato is a graduate of the Cate School and the University of Southern California.

== Career ==
Sato is the founder of Caddyshack to Corner Office, a golf blog that has profiled Corey Pavin and William Doyle.

Previously, he was the co-president and chief marketing officer of Crown Electrokinetics Corp., which is listed on Nasdaq. Prior to that, he was the co-founder and COO of FieldLevel. As the COO of FieldLevel, a social network for sports recruiting, Kai Sato oversaw the outward-facing facets of the company, including business development, sales and marketing. Sato was recognized as one of the Los Angeles Business Journal's "Twenty in Their 20s," in 2013.

Accredited for his expertise in sports technology and entrepreneurship, Sato speaks on these topics at industry events. He is also a contributor to Inc., Entrepreneur, and the Huffington Post.
