= Liu Kai (Song dynasty) =

Liu Kai (947-1000) was born at Daming in modern southernmost Hebei. He was known to be a highly accomplished scholar as well as a ruthless commander. Jiang Shaoyu (fl. 1115-1145) accused him of cannibalism and eating the minced livers of human beings, but this is likely a literary expression meant to evoke imagery of savageness rather than something to be taken literally.

Liu Kai passed the jinshi examination at the age of 26 in 973 and spent his time afterward as an administrator for public order (sikou canjun) at Songzhou in modern eastern Sichuan. He was promoted to grand master admonisher (zanshan dafu) by 979 and served primarily in a provincial civilian capacity. When Liu Kai requested Emperor Taizong of Song (r. 976-997) to send him to the battlefront against the Khitan Liao dynasty, he was given the office of attendant palace censor (dianzhong shi yushi).

== Bibliography ==
- Di Cosmo, Nicola (2009), Military Culture in Imperial China, Harvard University Press
