= Gbarzon District =

District in Grand Gedeh, Liberia

Coordinates: 6.0667°N 8.1281°W

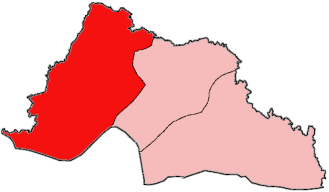
Location of Gbarzon District in Grand Gedeh County

Gbarzon District is one of three districts located in Grand Gedeh County, Liberia.

== Education ==
As of July 2024, Opportunity Network LIberia (ONLIB) had built two schools in Gbarzon District, one of which is in Neezonnee Clan. In October 2022, it broke ground on a new vocational school in Zleh Town.

== Chiefdoms and clans ==
- Chiefdoms of Gbarzon district: Biai and Gbason
- Clans of Biai chiefdom: Biai and Krason
- Clans of Gbason chiefdom: Gbagbor and Nisoni

== Notable people ==
- Alex C. Grant, superintendent and former representative of Gbarzon district
