= Song Kai =

Song Kai, may refer to:

- Song Kai (rower), Chinese rower
- Song Kai (politician), Chinese politician, the current president of the Chinese Football Association
