= Kai Paananen =

Finnish business executive

- Born: Kai Paananen; 1954 (age 71–72); Lappeenranta, Finland

Kai Paananen (born in 1954) is a Finnish businessman who owns the oil brokerage company SET Petrochemicals and the consulting company Southeast Trading. Before this, Kai Paananen has worked e.g. in a company called Karelia Trade Oy. Karelia Trade Oy was founded in 1978, Karelia Trade Oy was owned by Kai Paananen's father Yrjö Paananen, Martella Oy, Teräs Oy, Lakan Betoni Oy and the cities of Lappeenranta and Imatra. Only later did Kai Paananen become the owner.

Kauppahuone Karelia Trade was one of the largest builders of its time and a supplier of equipment for the mechanical forest industry in the Russian trade, and its turnover was over 200 million FIM. In the 1990s, Karelia Trade Oy delivered e.g. wood processing plants (28 pieces) in different parts of Russia, in addition to these, Karelia Trade built sports complexes and e.g. funded by SPR of the polyclinic to Spitak after the 1999 earthquake. Since then, the operations of the Karelia Trade company drifted into bankruptcy. Kai Paananen has also played a significant role in the operations of Airfix Aviation Oy[4], a private commercial airline that was one of the largest operators of its time. companies are on the U.S. sanctions list, which is intended to limit the ability of individuals and companies close to President Vladimir Putin to operate. Paananen himself has also been known to be the only native Finn on this list since 2015

== History ==
Paananen met businessman Gennady Timchenko in the 1980s. He represents Timchenko on the board of the holding company of Hartwall Arena. SET Petrochemicals has financed the operations of the Center Party of Finland and Sauli Niinistö's presidential election campaign. SET Petrochemicals is also the largest owner of the charter airline Airfix Aviation. Airfix Aviation is on the US sanctions list.

In the early 2000s, Southeast Trading consulted the Russian company Kinex Holding on the establishment of a planned tourist village on the Big Island. Paananen has also been the owner of the Karelia Trade store, which operated from 1978 to 1998 and employed at best 500 people in Finland and Russia. Paananen has also been the managing director of a private border crossing point in Uukuniemi from 1993 to 2007, which is the only private border crossing point on the Russian-Finnish border.
