= Qin Kai =

Qin Kai is the name of:

- Qin Kai (general) (fl. 300 BC), general of the state of Yan during the Warring States period
- Qin Kai (diver) (born 1986), Chinese diver
