= Kye Petersen =

Canadian skier (born 1990)

Personal information
- Nickname: Kye
- Born: January 18, 1990
- Website: Official Blog

Sport
- Sport: Freeskiing & Freestyle skiing

Kye Petersen is a Canadian pro skier, who was born on January 18, 1990. Kye currently resides on the south coast of British Columbia.

Kye has been featured in such movies as ReSession, Under The Influence, Lost And Found, Anomaly, The Tangerine Dream, The Edge of Never, Light The Wick. All I Can, sherpa cinemas.
