= Kai Leete =

Estonian ballet and folk dancer (1910–1995)

- Born: Ksenia Karukova; 26 May 1910; Tartu, Russian Empire
- Died: 14 March 1995 (aged 84); Võru, Estonia
- Education: Tartu Girls' High School
- Occupations: Ballet and folk dancer, choreographer and actor

Kai Leete (26 May 1910 – 14 March 1995), born Ksenia Karukova, was an Estonian ballet and folk dancer, choreographer and actor.

== Biography ==
Leete was born on 26 May 1910 in Tartu, Russian Empire (now part of Estonia), where her father was a master builder. She was educated at Tartu Girls' High School, graduating in 1928. She studied folk dance under Ullo Toomi [et].

Leete became a professional folk dancer and created dances for general dance parties. She worked as a professional ballet artist at the Vanemuine theatre in Tartu between 1927 and 1935, then performed in France and Belgium from 1935 to 1939.

During World War II, Leete was held in Brandenburg concentration camp in Brandenburg an der Havel, Nazi Germany. She was released in 1945.

After the war, Leete danced at Narva Theater from 1941 to 1943, then worked as an actor in the theater Spark from 1947 to 1948. She also worked in the capital city Tallinn.

Leete moved to Võru in 1960 and taught dances including the polka. She directed county dance parties, was the supervisor of the Võru Pioneeride Maja ballet circle and folk dance groups of over 60 dancers, and influenced the cultural landscape of Viljandi, Valga and Võru.

Leete died on 14 March 1995 in Võru, Estonia.

== Awards ==
- Meritorious cultural figure of the Estonian Soviet Socialist Republic [et] (1967)
- Order of Merit of the City of Võru [et] (1994)

== Legacy ==
In 2010, a documentary film Sündinud tantsule, Kai Leete (Born to dance, Kai Leete) was made by director Ruti Murusalu for the Estonian National Broadcasting Company about Leete's life.

In April and May 2015, the Võro City Gallery held an exhibition about Leete's life, titled Tants elu kaunim armastus (Dance the most beautiful love of life).

Also in 2015, the Võru County Dance and Song Festival was celebrated in honour of Leete.
