= Kai Zeiglar =

American football player (born 1981)

Profile
- Position: Offensive lineman

Personal information
- Born: January 15, 1981 (age 45)
- Listed height: 6 ft 3 in (1.91 m)
- Listed weight: 320 lb (145 kg)

Career information
- High school: Copperas Cove (Copperas Cove, Texas)
- College: Middle Tennessee Blue Raiders

Career history
- CenTex Barracudas (2008); Austin Turfcats (2009); Tulsa Talons (2011)
- Stats at ArenaFan.com

LeJuandro "Kai" Zeiglar (born January 15, 1981) is an American former professional football offensive and defensive linemen who played in the Arena Football League (AFL). He played college football at Middle Tennessee State.

== Early life ==
Kai attended Copperas Cove High School where he played under Head Coach Jack Welsh.

== College career ==
Before attending Middle Tennessee State, Zeigler went to Kilgore Junior College. He was also recruited by Memphis, Iowa State, LSU and New Mexico.

== Professional career ==
In 2008, Zeiglar was a member of the CenTex Barracudas. On April 16, 2009, he was signed by the Austin Turfcats. In 2011, Zeigler was a member of the Tulsa Talons of the Arena Football League.
