= Wang Kai =

Wang Kai may refer to:

- Wang Kai (fl. late 2nd century), advisor to the Han dynasty warlord Lü Bu; see Battle of Xiapi
- Wang Kai (Former Shu) (fl. early 10th century), Chancellor of Former Shu
- Wang Kai (politician) (born 1962), governor of Henan
- Wang Kai (general), lieutenant general, the last commander of the former 13th Group Army, China
- Wang Kai (actor) (born 1982), Chinese actor
- Wang Kai (Taiwanese actor) (1982–2026), Taiwanese actor
- Wang Kai (footballer, born 1983), Chinese footballer
- Wang Kai (footballer, born 1989), Chinese footballer
