= Kai Rüütel =

Estonian opera singer

Kai Rüütel (born 5 September 1981, in Tallinn) is a mezzo-soprano opera singer from Estonia.

== Education ==
Kai Rüütel studied at the Georg Ots Music School in Tallinn and then at the Koninklijk Conservatorium in The Hague and the Dutch National Opera Academy, graduating from the Masters programme with Special Honours. She won First Prize in the National Competition for Young Classical Singers in Estonia three years in a row in 2001, 2002 and 2003.

== Operatic career ==
In 2009 Rüütel became a member of the Jette Parker Young Artists Programme at the Royal Opera House, making her ROH debut as Venerable Lady in The Gambler and covering the role of Blanche. In the 09/10 season she sang Rosette in Manon and Flora in La Traviata and also performed these roles with the company when it toured to Japan with Antonio Pappano in September 2010.

In December 2010, she stepped in at the Royal Opera House for an indisposed Christine Rice as Hänsel in Hänsel und Gretel. Her other roles at the ROH in the 2010/11 season included Second Lady in Die Zauberflöte conducted by Sir Colin Davis, and Dorothée in Cendrillon. She also covered Madame Dangeville in Adriana Lecouvreur, Charlotte in Werther and Dunyasha in The Tsar’s Bride.

After graduating from the Jette Parker Young Artists Programme in 2011, she appeared in Scottish Opera's 2011–12 season as Hänsel in Hansel and Gretel. She also returned to the Royal Opera House as Meg Page in Falstaff, and Wellgunde in Keith Warner's productions of Das Rheingold and Götterdämmerung. She has since also appeared as Blanche in Prokofiev's The Gambler for Dutch National Opera and Sonyetka in Shostakovich's Lady Macbeth of the Mtsensk District for Vlaamse Opera.

== Recordings ==
Rüütel appears as Dorothée in Cendrillon on DVD for Virgin Classics, released in 2012.

== See also ==
- Music of Estonia
