= Kai Rautio =

Finnish ice hockey player and coach

- Born: July 22, 1964 (age 61) Oulu, Finland
- Height: 6 ft 1 in (185 cm)
- Weight: 194 lb (88 kg; 13 st 12 lb)
- Position: Defence
- Shot: Left
- Played for: SM-liiga; Oulun Kärpät; HIFK; KalPa; HPK
- National team: Finland
- NHL draft: Undrafted
- Playing career: 1985–2000

Kai Rautio (born July 22, 1964) is a Finnish former professional ice hockey defenceman.

Rautio played 12 seasons in the SM-liiga, registering 68 goals, 110 assists, 178 points, and 326 penalty minutes, while playing 535 games with four teams between 1985–86 and 1998–99.

Rautio began the 2013–14 Liiga season as the head coach for HPK, but was replaced on October 14, 2014, by Pasi Arvonen.
