= Kai Lawonn =

German computer scientist (born 1985)

Kai Lawonn (born 4 October 1985 in Berlin) is a German computer scientist and academic. He works in the fields of computer vision, exploratory data analysis, visualization, visual analytics, and medical visualization. Since April 2026, he has been professor of computer vision at Leipzig University and AI Professor at ScaDS.AI Dresden/Leipzig. Previously, he was professor of visualization and exploratory data analysis at the University of Jena.

== Biography ==
Lawonn studied mathematics with physics as a minor subject at the Free University of Berlin from 2006 to 2011 and graduated with a Diplom. He received his Ph.D. in computer science from Otto von Guericke University Magdeburg between 2012 and 2014, and obtained the Venia Legendi in computational visualistics in 2017.

From 2015 to 2019, Lawonn was an assistant professor of medical visualization at the University of Koblenz and Landau. In 2019, he moved to the University of Jena as an assistant professor, funded by the Carl Zeiss Foundation. From 2021, he was professor of visualization and exploratory data analysis there.

On 1 April 2026, Lawonn joined Leipzig University as professor of computer vision and AI Professor at ScaDS.AI Dresden/Leipzig. At Leipzig University, he heads the Computer Vision Group.

His research group works on methods in image analysis, image processing, computer vision, visual computing, visualization, data analysis, visual analytics, virtual reality, and human–computer interaction. A particular focus is on applications in medicine and the life sciences.

== Prizes and honors ==
- 2016: Eurographics PhD Award
- 2020: EuroVis Young Researcher Award
- 2021: DFG Heinz Maier-Leibnitz Prize
- 2021: Capital – Top 40 under 40
