= Darren Woodard =

American gridiron football player (born 1989)

No. 27, 35
- Position: Cornerback

Personal information
- Born: September 21, 1989 (age 37); Freeport, Texas, U.S.
- Listed height: 5 ft 11 in (1.80 m)
- Listed weight: 175 lb (79 kg)

Career information
- High school: Freeport (TX) Brazosport
- College: Kilgore College; UTEP
- NFL draft: 2013: undrafted

Career history
- St. Louis Rams (2013−2014)*; Arizona Cardinals (2014−2015)*; Ottawa Redblacks (2016)*
- * Offseason or practice squad member only
- Stats at Pro Football Reference

Darren Lydell Woodard (born September 21, 1989) is an American former professional football cornerback. He was signed by the St. Louis Rams as an undrafted free agent in 2013. He played college football for Kilgore College from 2009 to 2010, then played at UTEP. He has also played for the Arizona Cardinals.

== Early life ==
Woodard spent his prep career at Brazosport High School, earning three letters. He averaged 10 tackles per game as a senior. Was chosen All-District as a junior and senior and was a three-time All-County selection.

== College career ==
=== Kilgore College ===
First-team All-Conference choice at Kilgore College, accumulating 10 pass break-ups and three interceptions in 2010.

=== UTEP ===
Played in nine contests and made 12 stops (six solo), recorded two takeaways for 71 yards and also had two pass breakups on the year.

== Professional career ==
=== St. Louis Rams ===
After going undrafted in the 2013 NFL draft, Woodard was signed by the St. Louis Rams. He was waived on August 31, 2013 during final cuts, but was signed to the practice squad two days later. He was waived a week later to clear a spot on the practice squad for Jonathan Stewart. He was once again signed to the practice squad on October 1, 2013. He was signed to a future contract on December 30, 2013. He was waived during final cuts on August 29, 2014.

=== Arizona Cardinals ===
He was then signed to the Arizona Cardinals practice squad on November 12, 2014. On August 31, 2015, the Cardinals released Woodard.

=== Ottawa Redblacks ===
Woodard signed with the Ottawa Redblacks of the Canadian Football League on February 22, 2016.
