= Kai Ephron =

American and British film director

- Born: 25 August 1965; New York City, USA
- Occupation(s): Director, Producer, Actor and Location Manager
- Years active: 1995–present

Kai Ephron is an American and British film director. He is best known for his work on the feature film Benjamin Troubles.

== Career ==
Kai started his career as a lead actor in Flesh Suitcase (1995) and worked as a location manager in Eagle Eye, Inception, Super 8 and many more. His debut feature film Benjamin Troubles had been screened in Santa Fe Film Festival and Sedona Film Festival.

== Filmography ==
Year	Film	Director	Producer	Notes
2015	Benjamin Troubles	✓	✓	Feature Film
1995	Flesh Suitcase	✗	✓	Feature Film
1993	Sexual Intent	✗	✓	Feature Film
