= Kai Frobel =

German enviornmentalist

Kai Frobel is a German environmental ecologist. When he was young he lived very near the German part of the Iron Curtain, on the west side, near Coburg. He realized that the public-excluded security zone along the Iron Curtain had become a de facto wildlife reserve. When the Iron Curtain fell in 1989, he was instrumental in getting these wildlife reserves preserved as the European Green Belt. He runs the Ribbon of Life project which seeks to preserve these areas. He is associated with the BUND (Bund für Umwelt und Naturschutz Deutschland).

== Awards ==
- Federal Cross of Merit (2020)

== See also ==
- European Green Belt
