= Kai Lagesen =

Norwegian footballer (born 1965)

Personal information
- Date of birth: 26 February 1965 (age 61)

International career
Years	Team	Apps	(Gls)
1986–1987	Norway	2	(0)

Kai Lagesen (born 26 February 1965) is a Norwegian footballer. He played in two matches for the Norway national football team from 1986 to 1987.
