= Kai Hirschmann =

Kai Hirschmann (* 1965 in Duisburg, West Germany) is the deputy director of Essen's Institute for Terrorism Research and Security Policy and an author.

Hirschmann has said Hizb ut-Tahrir, an international Islamist organization, "shares the spirit of terrorism."

In 2002 he warned, "Everything so far suggests that Stingers have been exported from Afghanistan to Africa and were used in this attack," referring to an attack against Israeli tourists in Kenya, "We can't rule out the possibility that these rockets have been brought into Europe. In the Balkans region, Al-Qaeda fostered ties with local rebels and nothing can be ruled out... we have to include missiles in our scenarios of possible attacks in Europe."
