= Kai Steffen =

German footballer

Personal information
- Date of birth: 19 September 1961 (age 65)
- Place of birth: Hamburg, Germany

Youth career
- Hamburger SV

Senior career*
Years	Team	Apps	(Gls)
1979-1981	California Surf		
1984-?	Hamburger SV		
?	Los Angeles Lazers		

International career
1986, 1990	Germany		
- * Club domestic league appearances and goals

Kai Steffen (born 19 September 1961 in Hamburg) is a German former professional football player.

Steffen played in youth team of Hamburger SV. In 1979, he went to California Surf and played for two years in the NASL. 1981 he returned to Germany and in 1984 he got a contract for the professional team of Hamburger SV. In 1986, he made and played in the Olympics for the Germany national team, and played again in 1990. But after three years in the German Bundesliga, he made only seven matches. He started again a career in the United States and played for Los Angeles Lazers.
