= Kai G. Farley =

Liberian politician (born 1973)

Kai G. Farley (born 18 August 1973) is a Liberian politician and former revolutionary figure, who is the incumbent superintendent of Grand Gedeh county.

Prior to his appointment in 2018 by president George Weah, he served as member of parliament from Grand Gedeh's District 3 (now changed to 2) between 2006 and 2011.
