= Grand Gedeh County =

County of Liberia

- County
- Flag

- Location in Liberia
- Coordinates: 5°55′N 8°5′W
- Country: Liberia
- Capital: Zwedru
- Districts: 3
- Established: 1964

Government
  - Superintendent: Alex C. Grant

Area
  - Total: 10,484 km^{2} (4,048 sq mi)

Population (2022)
  - Total: 216,692
  - Density: 20.669/km^{2} (53.532/sq mi)
- Time zone: UTC+0 (GMT)
- HDI (2018): 0.438 low · 5th of 15

Grand Gedeh is a county in the eastern portion of the West African nation of Liberia. One of 15 counties that constitute the first-level of administrative division in the nation, it has three districts. Zwedru (formerly Tchien) serves as the capital of the county. Measuring 4,048 square miles (10,480 km^{2}), it is larger than 34 independent countries including Lebanon, Trinidad and Tobago, Cape Verde, Malta and Mauritius and the combined area of the US states of Delaware and Rhode Island. As of the 2022 Census, it had a population of 216,692, making it the 7th most populous county in Liberia. Grand Gedeh has lower tropical forests which has mid size hills composed of various valleys and water courses. These forests receive a very high rainfall ranging from 3,000 mm (120 in) to 4,100 mm (160 in) per year.

Grand Gedeh's County Superintendent is Alex C. Grant. The county is bordered by Nimba County to the west, Sinoe County to the southwest, and River Gee County to the southeast. The northern part of Grand Gedeh borders the nation of Côte d'Ivoire.

== Geography ==
Grand Gedeh has lower tropical forests which have mid-size hills composed of various valleys and water courses. These forests receive a very high rainfall ranging from 3,000 mm (120 in) to 4,100 mm (160 in) per year in two distinct seasons. It has evergreen forests. While in the uplands it is conducive for rice cultivation, the low lying areas are conducive for yam, cocoa, plantains, potatoes, vegetables, rubber, coffee and sugarcane. Grand Chedah county has two community forest, namely Neezonnie, occupying an area of 42,424 ha (104,830 acres) and Blouquia, occupying an area of 43,796 ha (108,220 acres). There are three National plantation areas: the SIGA Reforestation project (247.2 ha (611 acres)), EAC Reforestation project (59.2 ha (146 acres)) and the WATRACE Reforestation project (58.4 ha (144 acres)). It also shares the National proposed reserve of Grebo Forest (97,136 ha (240,030 acres)) with River Gee County.

== Demographics ==
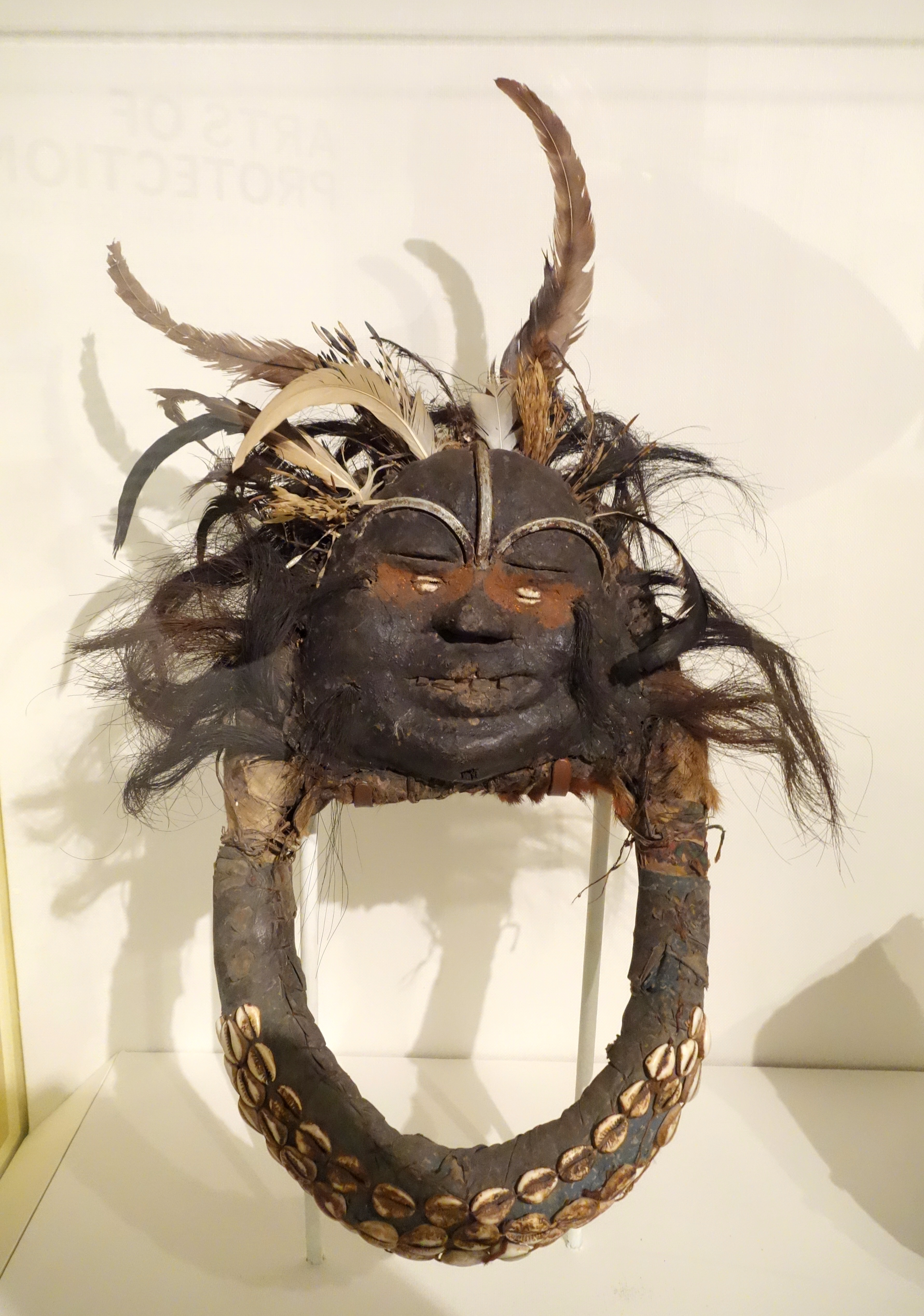
Divination object in the county

In the 1984 Census, the county had a population of 63,028 people. The county is home to large Muslim and Ivorian populations. As of 2008, the county had a population of 125,258: 64,994 male and 60,264 female. The sex ratio was 107.8 compared to 96.3 in the 1994 census. The number of households during 2008 was 8,969 and the average size of the households was 6.8. The population was 3 percent of the total population, while it was 3.60 percent in 1994. The county had an area of 4,191 sq mi and the density per square mile was 30. The density during the 1984 census stood at 15. Liberia experienced civil war during various times and the total number of people displaced on account of wars as of 2008 in the county was 81,624. The number of people residing in urban areas was 41,673, with 20,696 males and 20,977 females. The total number of people in rural areas was 83,585, with 44,298 males and 39,287 females. The total fraction of people residing in urban areas was 33.27 percent, while the remaining .67 percent were living in rural areas. The number of people resettled as of 2008 was 4,508 while the number of people who were not resettled was 263. The number of literates above the age of ten as of 2008 was 19,297 while the number of illiterates was 19,758 making the literacy rate to 49.41. The total number of literate males was 12,513 while the total number of literate females was 6,784.

== Economy ==
As of 2011, the area of rice plantation was 9,250 ha (22,900 acres), which was 3.874 percent of the total area of rice planted in the country. The total production stood at 8300 metric tonnes. As of 2011, the number of Cassava plantations was 4200, which was 3.4 percent of the total area of Cassava planted in the country. The total production stood at 1140 metric tonnes. The number of Cocoa plantations was 1140, which was 2.9 percent of the total area of Cassava planted in the country. The number of rubber plantations was 230, which was 0.4 percent of the total area of Cassava planted in the country. The number of Coffee plantations was 240, which was 1.1 percent of the total area of Cassava planted in the country. As of 2008, the county had 2,686 paid employees, 13,695 self-employed people, 15,578 family workers, 4,868 people looking for work, 7,159 not working people, 13,840 people working in households, 36,350 students, 236 retired people, 1,621 incapacitated people, 1,929 part-time workers and 8,951 others, making the total working population of 106,913.

== Administration ==
The Legislature of Liberia was modeled based on the Legislature of the United States. It is bicameral in nature with a Senate and the House of Representatives. There are 15 counties in the country and based on the population, each county is defined to have at least two members, while the total number of members to the house including the Speaker is 73. Each member represents an electoral district and is elected to a six-year term based on popular vote. There were 30 senators, two each for the 15 counties and they serve a nine-year term (30 senators, 15 counties, and nine years from 2011). Senators are also elected based on a plurality of votes. The Vice-President is the head of the Senate and he also acts as President in his absence. Districts of Grand Gedeh County include (2008 population): Gbarzon District (74,255), Konobo District (21,424) and Tchien District (30,467) are the districts in the county.

== See also ==
- Gwin Town
- Tuzon
- Tian Town
