= Tchien District =

Coordinates: 6°04′00″N 8°07′41″W

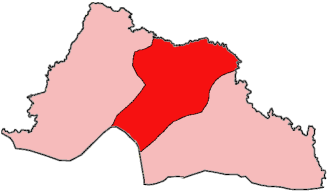
Location of Tchien District in Grand Gedeh County

Tchien District is one of three districts located in Grand Gedeh County, Liberia.
