= List of elections in 2024 =

This is a list of elections that were held in 2024. The National Democratic Institute also maintains a calendar of elections around the world.

- 2024 United Nations Security Council election
- 2024 national electoral calendar
- 2024 local electoral calendar

The year 2024 is notable for the large number of elections that were held worldwide: 64 countries from around the world, home to nearly half of the global population, voted, including eight of the world's 10 most populous nations – Bangladesh, Brazil, India, Indonesia, Mexico, Pakistan, Russia, and the United States; in addition, the European Union held elections for the European Parliament in June. Around 4 billion voters – approximately half of the world's population – were eligible to vote in elections that year. 2024 has been called the year of elections. This year had a big impact on global politics.

Almost every incumbent party worldwide facing election in 2024 lost vote share, including in South Africa, India, France, the United Kingdom, the United States, and Japan, though they did not necessarily lose power. Among democracies, over 80 percent saw the incumbent party lose support compared to the last election. This is the first time this has ever happened since 1905 (when data was first recorded) and the first time in the history of democracy, as universal suffrage began in 1894.

== Africa ==
- Algeria
  - 2024 Algerian presidential election, 7 September
- Botswana
  - 2024 Botswana general election, 30 October
- Chad
  - 2024 Chadian presidential election, 6 May
  - 2024 Chadian parliamentary election, 29 December
- Comoros
  - 2024 Comorian presidential election, 14 January
- Ethiopia
  - 2024 Ethiopian presidential election, 7 October
- Gabon
  - 2024 Gabonese constitutional referendum, 16 November
- Ghana
  - 2024 Ghanaian general election, 7 December
- Liberia
  - 2024 Liberian by-elections, 23 April
- Madagascar
  - 2024 Malagasy parliamentary election, 29 May
- Mauritania
  - 2024 Mauritanian presidential election, 29 June
- Mauritius
  - 2024 Mauritian general election, 10 November
- Mozambique
  - 2024 Mozambican general election, 9 October
- Namibia
  - 2024 Namibian general election, 27 November
- Nigeria
  - 2024 Edo State gubernatorial election, 21 September
  - 2024 Ondo State gubernatorial election, 16 November
- Rwanda
  - 2024 Rwandan general election, 15 July
- Senegal
  - 2024 Senegalese presidential election, 24 March
  - 2024 Senegalese parliamentary election, 17 November
- Somaliland
  - 2024 Somaliland presidential election, 13 November (Note: Limited or no international recognition.)
- South Africa
  - 2024 South African general election, 29 May
- Puntland
  - 2024 Puntland presidential election, 8 January
- Togo
  - 2024 Togolese parliamentary election, 29 April
- Tunisia
  - 2024 Tunisian presidential election, 6 October
- Tanzania
  - 2024 Tanzanian local elections, 27 November

== Americas ==
- Aruba
  - 2024 Aruban general election, 6 December
- Belize
  - 2024 Belizean municipal elections, 6 March
- Brazil
  - 2024 Brazilian municipal elections, 6 October (first round) & 27 October (second round)
    - 2024 São Paulo mayoral election
    - 2024 Rio de Janeiro mayoral election
- Canada
  - 2024 British Columbia general election, 19 October
  - 2024 New Brunswick general election, 21 October
  - 2024 Saskatchewan general election, 28 October
  - 2024 Nova Scotia general election, 26 November
- Chile
  - 2024 Chilean municipal elections, 27 October (first round) & 24 November (second round)
  - 2024 Chilean regional elections, 27 October (first round) & 24 November (second round)
- Costa Rica
  - 2024 Costa Rican municipal elections, 4 February
- El Salvador
  - 2024 Salvadoran presidential election, 4 February
  - 2024 Salvadoran legislative election, 4 February and 3 March
- Dominican Republic
  - 2024 Dominican Republic municipal elections, 17 February
  - 2024 Dominican Republic general election, 19 May
- Jamaica
  - 2024 Jamaican local elections, 26 February
- Mexico
  - 2024 Mexican general election, 2 June
  - 2024 Mexican local elections, 2 June
- Panama
  - 2024 Panamanian general election, 5 May
- Puerto Rico
  - 2024 Puerto Rican general elections, 5 November
- Sint Maarten
  - January 2024 Sint Maarten general election, 11 January
  - August 2024 Sint Maarten general election, 19 August
- United States
  - 2024 United States elections, 5 November
    - 2024 United States gubernatorial elections
    - 2024 United States House of Representatives elections
    - 2024 United States presidential election
    - 2024 United States Senate elections
    - 2024 United States state legislative elections
- Uruguay
  - 2024 Uruguayan general election, 27 October (first round) & 24 November (second round)
- Venezuela
  - 2024 Venezuelan presidential election, 28 July

== Asia ==
- Azerbaijan
  - 2024 Azerbaijani presidential election, 7 February
  - 2024 Azerbaijani parliamentary election, 1 September
- Bangladesh
  - 2024 Bangladeshi general election, 7 January
- Bhutan
  - 2023–24 Bhutanese National Assembly election, 9 January (second round)
- Cambodia
  - 2024 Cambodian Senate election, 25 February
  - 2024 Cambodian provincial elections, 26 May
- India
  - 2024 elections in India
    - 2024 Indian general election, 19 April – 1 June
    - 2024 Arunachal Pradesh Legislative Assembly election, 19 April
    - 2024 Sikkim Legislative Assembly election, 19 April
    - 2024 Andhra Pradesh Legislative Assembly election, 13 May
    - 2024 Odisha Legislative Assembly election, 13 May – 1 June
    - 2024 Jammu and Kashmir Legislative Assembly election, 18 September – 1 October
    - 2024 Haryana Legislative Assembly election, 5 October
    - 2024 Maharashtra Legislative Assembly election, 20 November
    - 2024 Jharkhand Legislative Assembly election, 13–20 November
- Indonesia
  - 2024 Indonesian general election, 14 February
  - 2024 Indonesian local elections, 27 November
    - 2024 Jakarta gubernatorial election
- Iran
  - 2024 Iranian legislative election, 1 March (first round) & 10 May (second round)
  - 2024 Iranian presidential election, 28 June (first round) & 5 July (second round)
- Israel
  - 2024 Israeli municipal elections, 27 February
  - 2024 Israeli chief rabbi elections, 29 September (first round) & 31 October (second round)
- Japan
  - 2024 Japanese general election, 27 October
  - 2023 Japanese by-elections, 28 April
  - 2024 Shizuoka Prefecture gubernatorial election, 26 May
  - 2024 Tokyo gubernatorial election, 7 July
  - 2024 Hyogo gubernatorial election, 17 November
- Jordan
  - 2024 Jordanian general election, 10 September
- Kuwait
  - 2024 Kuwaiti general election, 4 April
- Maldives
  - 2024 Maldivian parliamentary election, 21 April
- Mongolia
  - 2024 Mongolian parliamentary election, 28 June
- Pakistan
  - 2024 Pakistani general election, 8 February
  - 2024 Pakistani provincial elections, 8 February
    - 2024 Pakistani by-elections
    - 2024 Balochistan provincial election
    - 2024 Khyber Pakhtunkhwa provincial election
    - 2024 Punjab provincial election
    - 2024 Sindh provincial election
  - 2024 Pakistani presidential election, 9 March
  - 2024 Pakistani Senate election, 2 April
- South Korea
  - 2024 South Korean legislative election, 10 April
- Sri Lanka
  - 2024 Sri Lankan presidential election, 21 September
  - 2024 Sri Lankan parliamentary election, 14 November
- Syria
  - 2024 Syrian parliamentary election, 15 July
- Taiwan
  - 2024 Taiwanese presidential election, 13 January
  - 2024 Taiwanese legislative election, 13 January
- Thailand
  - 2024 Thai Senate election, 9–26 June
- Uzbekistan
  - 2024 Uzbek parliamentary election, 27 October

== Europe ==
- European Union
  - 2024 European Parliament election, 6–9 June
- Austria
  - 2024 Austrian legislative election, 29 September
  - 2024 Vorarlberg state election, 13 October
  - 2024 Styrian state election, 24 November
- Belarus
  - 2024 Belarusian parliamentary election, 25 February
  - 2024 Belarusian Council of the Republic election, 4 April
- Belgium
  - 2024 Belgian federal election, 9 June
  - 2024 Belgian regional elections, 9 June
  - 2024 Belgian local elections, 13 October
- Bosnia and Herzegovina
  - 2024 Bosnian municipal elections, 6 October
- Bulgaria
  - June 2024 Bulgarian parliamentary election, 9 June
  - October 2024 Bulgarian parliamentary election, 27 October
- Croatia
  - 2024 Croatian parliamentary election, 17 April
  - 2024–25 Croatian presidential election, 29 December (first round)
- Cyprus
  - 2024 Cypriot local elections, 9 June
- Czech Republic
  - 2024 Czech regional elections, 20–21 September
  - 2024 Czech Senate election, 20–21 September (first round) & 27–28 September (second round)
- Finland
  - 2024 Finnish presidential election, 28 January (first round) & 11 February (second round)
- France
  - 2024 French legislative election, 30 June (first round) & 7 July (second round)
- Georgia
  - 2024 Georgian parliamentary election, 26 October
  - 2024 Georgian presidential election, 14 December
- Germany
  - 2024 Saxony state election, 1 September
  - 2024 Thuringian state election, 1 September
  - 2024 Brandenburg state election, 22 September
- Hungary
  - 2024 Hungarian presidential election, 26 February
  - 2024 Hungarian local elections, 9 June
    - 2024 Budapest mayoral election
    - 2024 Budapest Assembly election
- Iceland
  - 2024 Icelandic presidential election, 1 June
  - 2024 Icelandic parliamentary election, 30 November
- Ireland
  - 2024 Irish local elections, 7 June
  - 2024 Irish general election, 29 November
- Italy
  - 2024 Italian local elections, 8–9 June (first round) & 23–25 June (second round)
  - 2024 Italian regional elections
    - 2024 Sardinian regional election, 25 February
    - 2024 Abruzzo regional election, 10 March
    - 2024 Basilicata regional election, 21–22 April
    - 2024 Piedmontese regional election, 8–9 June
    - 2024 Ligurian regional election, 27–28 October
    - 2024 Emilia-Romagna regional election, 17–18 November
    - 2024 Umbrian regional election, 17–18 November
- Lithuania
  - 2024 Lithuanian presidential election, 12 May (first round) & 26 May (second round)
  - 2024 Lithuanian parliamentary election, 13 October (first round) & 27 October (second round)
- Malta
  - 2024 Maltese local elections, 8 June
- Moldova
  - 2024 Moldovan presidential election, 20 October (first round) & 3 November (second round)
- Montenegro
  - 2024 Montenegrin municipal elections, 26 May and 2 June
- North Macedonia
  - 2024 North Macedonian parliamentary election, 8 May
  - 2024 North Macedonian presidential election, 24 April (first round) & 8 May (second round)
- Poland
  - 2024 Polish local elections, 7 April (first round) & 21 April (second round)
- Portugal
  - 2024 Azorean regional election, 4 February
  - 2024 Portuguese legislative election, 10 March
  - 2024 Madeiran regional election, 26 May
- Romania
  - 2024 Romanian local elections, 9 June
  - 2024 Romanian presidential election, 24 November (first round, annulled)
  - 2024 Romanian parliamentary election, 1 December
- Russia
  - 2024 Russian presidential election, 15–17 March
  - 2024 Russian regional elections, 8 September
- San Marino
  - 2024 San Marino general election, 9 June
- Serbia
  - 2024 Serbian local elections, 2 June
    - 2024 Belgrade City Assembly election, 2 June
- Slovakia
  - 2024 Slovak presidential election, 23 March (first round) & 6 April (second round)
- South Ossetia
  - 2024 South Ossetian parliamentary election, 9 June
- Spain
  - 2024 Galician regional election, 18 February
  - 2024 Basque regional election, 21 April
  - 2024 Catalan regional election, 12 May
- Turkey
  - 2024 Turkish local elections, 31 March
- United Kingdom
  - 2024 United Kingdom local elections, 2 May
  - 2024 United Kingdom general election, 4 July

== Oceania ==
- Australia
  - 2024 Tasmanian state election, 23 March
  - 2024 Northern Territory general election, 24 August
  - 2024 Australian Capital Territory election, 19 October
  - 2024 Queensland state election, 26 October
- Kiribati
  - 2024 Kiribati parliamentary election, 14 August (first round) & 19 August (second round)
  - 2024 Kiribati presidential election, 25 October
- Palau
  - 2024 Palauan general election, 5 November
- Solomon Islands
  - 2024 Solomon Islands general election, 17 April
- Tuvalu
  - 2024 Tuvaluan general election, 26 January

== See also ==
- List of elections in 2023
- List of elections in 2025
