= 2024 local electoral calendar =

Local elections held in 2024

This local electoral calendar for 2024 lists the subnational elections held in 2024. Referendums, recall and retention elections, and national by-elections (special elections) are also included.

== January ==
- 30 January: Canada, Newfoundland and Labrador, Conception Bay East–Bell Island, House of Assembly by-election

== February ==
- 4 February:
  - Costa Rica, Municipal Councils
  - Japan, Kyoto, Mayor
  - Portugal, Azores, Legislative Assembly
- 7 February: Canada, Prince Edward Island, Borden-Kinkora, Legislative Assembly by-election
- 8 February: Pakistan
  - Balochistan, Provincial Assembly
  - Khyber Pakhtunkhwa, Provincial Assembly
  - Punjab, Provincial Assembly
  - Sindh, Provincial Assembly
- 11 February: Germany, repeat of the annulled part of the 2021 federal election in Berlin
- 13 February: United States, New York, 3rd congressional district, special election
- 14 February: Indonesia, Regional Houses of Representatives
- 15 February: United Kingdom
  - Kingswood, by-election
  - Wellingborough, by-election
- 18 February:
  - Dominican Republic, municipal elections
  - Spain, Galicia, Parliament
- 25 February: Italy, Sardinia, Regional Council
- 26 February: Jamaica, local elections
- 27 February: Israel, municipal elections
- 29 February: United Kingdom, Rochdale, by-election

== March ==
- 2 March: Australia, Dunkley, by-election
- 3 March:
  - El Salvador, Mayors and Municipal Councils
  - Switzerland, St. Gallen, Schwyz, Uri
- 4 March: Canada, Durham, House of Commons by-election
- 5 March: United States, California
  - Fresno, Mayor
  - Los Angeles, City Council (1st round)
  - Los Angeles County, Board of Supervisors and District Attorney (1st round)
  - Orange County, Board of Supervisors, general elections
  - Sacramento, Mayor (1st round)
  - San Diego, Mayor (1st round)
  - San José, Mayor
  - Riverside, Mayor
- 6 March: Belize, Mayors and Municipal Councils
- 9 March: Bangladesh:
  - Comilla, City Corporation by-election
  - Mymensingh, City Corporation election
- 10 March:
  - Austria, Salzburg, Mayor and City Council
  - Italy, Abruzzo, Regional Council
- 12 March: Cook Islands, Penrhyn, by-election
- 14 March: Vanuatu, Ambrym, by-election
- 16 March: Australia
  - Queensland, Mayors, Regional Councils, City Councils, Aboriginal Shire Councils and Shire Councils
    - Brisbane, Lord Mayor and City Council
    - City of Gold Coast, Mayor and City Council
    - Inala, by-election
    - Ipswich West, by-election
  - South Australia, First Nations Voice
- 23 March: Australia
  - South Australia, Dunstan, by-election
  - Tasmania, House of Assembly
- 24 March: Austria, Salzburg, Mayor, runoff election
- 28 March: Tonga, Vavaʻu 14, by-election
- 31 March:
  - Turkey, Mayors and Municipal Councils
  - Thailand, Loei province, President of Provincial Administrative Organization

== April ==
- 2 April: United States
  - Alaska, Anchorage, Mayor (1st round)
  - Wisconsin, Milwaukee, Mayor
- 7 April:
  - Poland, Provincial Assemblies, County Councils, Commune Councils and Commune Heads (1st round)
  - Switzerland, Thurgau
- 13 April:
  - Australia, New South Wales, Cook, by-election
  - Philippines, Special Geographic Area, municipality creation plebiscite
- 15 April: Canada, Newfoundland and Labrador, Fogo Island-Cape Freels, House of Assembly by-election
- 16 April: Taiwan, local by-election
  - Taichung, Municipal Councils by-election
  - Yunlin, Huwei, Mailiao
  - Miaoli, Miaoli
  - Taitung, Dawu
  - Yilan, County Councils by-election
- 19 April: India
  - Arunachal Pradesh, Legislative Assembly
  - Sikkim, Legislative Assembly
- 21 April:
  - Kosovo, North Kosovo, Referendum
  - Poland, Commune Heads (2nd round, if necessary)
  - Spain, Basque Country, Parliament
- 21–22 April: Italy, Basilicata, Regional Council
- 23 April:
  - Liberia, Grand Gedeh-1, House of Representatives by-election
  - Liberia, Nimba, Senatorial by-election
- 28 April: Japan, National Diet, House of Representatives by-elections
  - Nagasaki 3rd district
  - Shimane 1st district
  - Tokyo 15th district
- 29 April: Democratic Republic of the Congo, gubernatorial elections (indirect)
- 29 April: Togo, regional elections
- 30 April: United States, New York, 26th congressional district, special election

== May ==
- 2 May:
  - Canada, Ontario, Legislative Assembly by-elections in:
    - Lambton—Kent—Middlesex, provincial by-election
    - Milton, provincial by-election
  - United Kingdom, local elections
    - Greater London, Mayor and Assembly
    - Blackpool South, by-election
- 4 May: Australia, Tasmania, Legislative Council
- 7 May: India
  - Gujarat, Vijapur, by-election
    - Porbandar, by-election
    - Manavadar, by-election
    - Khambhat, by-election
    - Vaghodiya, by-election
  - Karnataka, Shorapur, by-election
- 11 May: Malaysia, Selangor, Kuala Kubu Baharu, Legislative Assembly by-election
- 12 May: Spain, Catalonia, Parliament
- 13 May: India
  - Andhra Pradesh, Legislative Assembly
  - Odisha, Legislative Assembly (1st phase)
- 14 May: United States
  - United States, Alaska, Anchorage, Mayor (2nd round)
  - West Virginia, Wheeling, municipal election
- 20 May: India, Odisha, Legislative Assembly (2nd phase)
- 21 May:
  - Canada, Nova Scotia, Pictou West, House of Assembly by-election
  - United States, California, 20th congressional district, special election
- 25 May: India, Odisha, Legislative Assembly (3rd phase)
- 26 May:
  - Cambodia, Provincial, Municipal, District and Khan Councils
  - Germany, Thuringia local elections
  - Japan, Shizuoka Prefecture, Governor
  - Portugal, Madeira, Legislative Assembly
- 27 May: Canada, Newfoundland and Labrador, Baie Verte-Green Bay, House of Assembly by-election

== June ==
- 1 June:
  - India, Odisha, Legislative Assembly (4th phase)
  - Taiwan, local by-election
    - Hsinchu, County Councils by-election
    - Taitung, County Councils by-election
- 2 June:
  - Mexico, local elections
  - Serbia, Belgrade, City Assembly
- 7 June: Ireland, City and County Councils
- 8 June: Malta, Local Councils
- 8-9 June: Italy, local elections (1st round)
- 9 June:
  - Belgium, Flemish, Walloon, Brussels and German-Speakers parliaments
  - Canada, Quebec, Gatineau, Mayor
  - Cyprus, local elections
  - Germany, local elections in:
    - Baden-Württemberg
    - Brandenburg
    - Hamburg (2024 Hamburg borough elections)
    - Mecklenburg-Vorpommern
    - Rhineland-Palatinate
    - Saarland
    - Saxony
    - Saxony-Anhalt
  - Italy, Piedmont, Regional Council
  - Hungary, Mayors, County Assemblies and Municipal Assemblies
  - Romania, County Presidents, County Councils, Mayors, Local Councils, Sector Mayors and Sector Councils
- 10 June: Canada, Ontario, Mississauga, Mayor
- 11 June: United States:
  - Ohio, 6th congressional district, special election
  - Nevada, Las Vegas, Mayor (1st round)
- 18 June: Canada, Manitoba, Tuxedo, Legislative Assembly by-election
- 23 June: Thailand
  - Nakhon Sawan province, President of Provincial Administrative Organization
  - Ang Thong province, President of the Provincial Administrative Organization
- 23–24 June: Italy, local elections (2nd round)
- 24 June: Canada, Toronto—St. Paul's, House of Commons by-election
- 25 June: United States, Colorado, 4th congressional district, special election
- 29 June: Philippines, Las Piñas, barangay boundary plebiscite
- 30 June: Thailand, Pathum Thani province, President of Provincial Administrative Organization

== July ==
- 6 July: Malaysia, Penang, Sungai Bakap, Legislative Assembly by-election
- 7 July: Japan, Tokyo, Governor
- 20 July: New Zealand, Tauranga, Mayor and City Council
- 27 July: Taiwan, local by-election
  - Pingtung, Changzhi

== August ==
- 10 August: United States, Hawaii, Honolulu, Mayor
- 17 August: Malaysia, Kelantan, Nenggiri, Legislative Assembly by-election
- 20 August: United States, Florida, Miami-Dade County, Mayor
- 22 August: Canada, Newfoundland and Labrador, Waterford Valley, House of Assembly by-election
- 24 August: Australia, Northern Territory, Legislative Assembly
- 27 August: United States, Oklahoma, Tulsa, Mayor

== September ==
- 1 September: Germany
  - Saxony, Landtag
  - Thuringia, Landtag
- 8 September: Russia, Governors, Mayors, Territorial Legislative Assemblies, Municipal Councils
- 14 September: Australia, New South Wales, Mayors, Regional Councils, City Councils and Shire Councils
  - ~~Norfolk Island, Regional Council~~
- 16 September: Canada, House of Commons by-elections in:
  - Elmwood—Transcona
  - LaSalle—Émard—Verdun
- 18 September:
  - India, Jammu and Kashmir, Legislative Assembly (1st phase)
  - United States, New Jersey, 10th congressional district, special election
- 19 September: Canada, Ontario, Bay of Quinte, Legislative Assembly by-election
- 21 September: Nigeria, Edo, Governor
- 20–21 September: Czech Republic, Regional Councils
- 22 September: Germany, Brandenburg, Landtag
- 25 September: India, Jammu and Kashmir, Legislative Assembly (2nd phase)
- 28 September: Malaysia, Johor, Mahkota, Legislative Assembly by-election

== October ==
- 1 October: India:
  - Jammu and Kashmir, Legislative Assembly (3rd phase)
- 5 October: India:
  - Haryana, Legislative Assembly
- 6 October:
  - Brazil, municipal elections (1st round)
    - Rio de Janeiro, Mayor (1st round)
    - São Paulo, Mayor (1st round)
  - Bosnia and Herzegovina, Municipal elections
- 13 October:
  - Austria, Vorarlberg, Landtag
  - Belgium, local elections
- 17 October:
  - Canada, Yukon, Municipal elections
- 19 October:
  - Australia:
    - Australian Capital Territory, Legislative Assembly
    - New South Wales
      - Epping, by-election
      - Hornsby, by-election
      - Pittwater, by-election
  - Canada:
    - British Columbia, Legislative Assembly
    - Nova Scotia, Municipal elections
- 21 October: Canada, New Brunswick, Legislative Assembly
- 26 October:
  - Australia:
    - Queensland, Legislative Assembly
    - Victoria, local elections
  - Sri Lanka, Elpitiya, Divisional Council
- 26–27 October:
  - Chile, municipal and regional elections (1st round)
- 27 October:
  - Brazil, municipal elections (2nd round)
  - Japan:
    - Iwate at-large district, House of Councillors by-election
    - Okayama, Governor
    - Toyama, Governor
- 27–28 October: Italy, Liguria, Regional Council
- 28 October: Canada, Saskatchewan, Legislative Assembly

== November ==
- 5 November: United States, Quadrennial elections
  - Arizona, Phoenix, Mayor
  - California
    - Los Angeles, City Council (2nd round)
    - Los Angeles County, District Attorney (2nd round)
    - Orange County, Board of Supervisors (2nd round)
    - Sacramento, Mayor (2nd round)
    - San Diego, Mayor (2nd round)
    - San Francisco, Mayor and District Attorney
  - Delaware, Governor, Lieutenant Governor
  - Indiana, Governor, Lieutenant Governor, and Attorney General
  - Maryland, Baltimore, Mayor
  - Missouri, Governor, Lieutenant Governor, Secretary of State, and Attorney General
  - Montana, Governor, Lieutenant Governor, Secretary of State, and Attorney General
  - Nevada, Las Vegas, Mayor (2nd round)
  - New Hampshire, Governor and Executive Council
  - North Carolina
    - Council of State (Governor, Lieutenant Governor, Secretary of State, and Attorney General)
    - Raleigh, Mayor
  - North Dakota, Governor and Lieutenant Governor
  - Oklahoma, Tulsa, Mayor run-off
  - Oregon
    - Secretary of State and Attorney General
    - Portland, Mayor and City Council
  - Pennsylvania, Attorney General
  - Texas, 18th congressional district, special election
  - Utah, Governor, Lieutenant Governor, and Attorney General
  - Vermont, Governor, Lieutenant Governor, Secretary of State, and Attorney General
  - Washington, Governor, Lieutenant Governor, Secretary of State, and Attorney General
  - West Virginia, Governor, Secretary of State, Attorney General, State Treasurer
  - Wisconsin, 8th congressional district, special election
  - American Samoa, Governor (1st round) and House of Representatives
  - Guam, Legislature
  - Northern Mariana Islands, Senate, House of Representatives
  - Puerto Rico, Governor, Senate, House of Representatives, Referendum
  - United States Virgin Islands, Legislature
- 13 November:
  - Canada, Saskatchewan, Municipal elections
  - India, Jharkhand, Legislative Assembly (1st phase)
- 16 November:
  - South Australia, Black, by-election
  - Guernsey, Alderney, States
  - Libya, Municipal elections
  - Nigeria, Ondo, Governor
- 17 November:
  - Japan, Hyōgo, Governor
  - Italy
    - Emilia-Romagna, Regional Council
    - Umbria, Regional Council
- 19 November: American Samoa, Governor (2nd round)
- 20 November: India
  - Jharkhand, Legislative Assembly (2nd phase)
  - Maharashtra, Legislative Assembly
- 24 November:
  - Austria, Styria, Landtag
  - Chile, municipal and regional elections (2nd round)
- 26 November: Canada, Nova Scotia, General Assembly
- 27 November: Indonesia, local (37 governors, 98 mayors and 415 regents)
- 30 November: Guernsey, Alderney, President of the States

== December ==
- 1 December: France, Ardennes's 1st constituency, National Assembly by-election (1st round)
- 8 December: France, Ardennes's 1st constituency, National Assembly by-election (2nd round)
- 11 December: Guernsey, Sark, Chief Pleas
- 16 December: Canada, Cloverdale—Langley City, House of Commons by-election
- 18 December: Canada, Alberta, Lethbridge-West, Legislative Assembly by-election

== See also ==
- 2024 United States ballot measures
