= Chūō Shinkansen =

Under-construction maglev high-speed train line in Japan

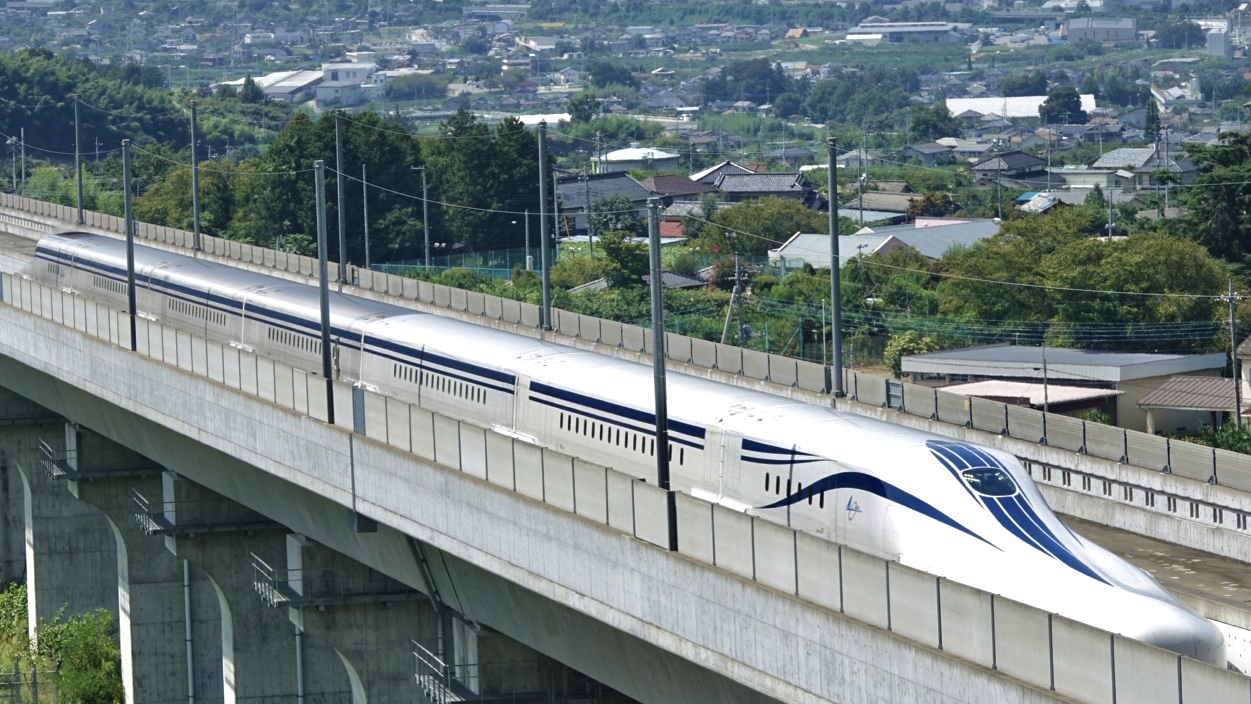
- An improved L0 Series maglev train undergoing testing on the Yamanashi test track in 2020

Overview
- Native name: 中央新幹線
- Status: Under construction
- Owner: JR Central
- Termini: Shinagawa; Shin-Ōsaka
- Stations: 9
- Website: Official website

Service
- Type: Maglev
- System: Shinkansen
- Rolling stock: L0 Series

History
- Planned opening: Tokyo–Nagoya (phase 1): No earlier than 2035 (originally 2027); Nagoya–Osaka (phase 2): No earlier than 2037 (maybe 2045)
- Opened: 1997 (test track)

Technical
- Line length: Test track: 42.8 km (26.6 mi); Tokyo–Nagoya: 285.6 km (177.5 mi); Tokyo–Osaka: 438.0 km (272.2 mi)
- Num of tracks: 2
- Minimum radius: 8,000 m (5.0 mi; 26,000 ft)
- Electrification: Guideway propulsion coils: 33 kV AC, variable frequency (51.4 Hz at 500 km/h); Vehicles: 9.8 kHz induction
- Operating speed: 505 km/h (314 mph)
- Maximum incline: 4.0%
Route map
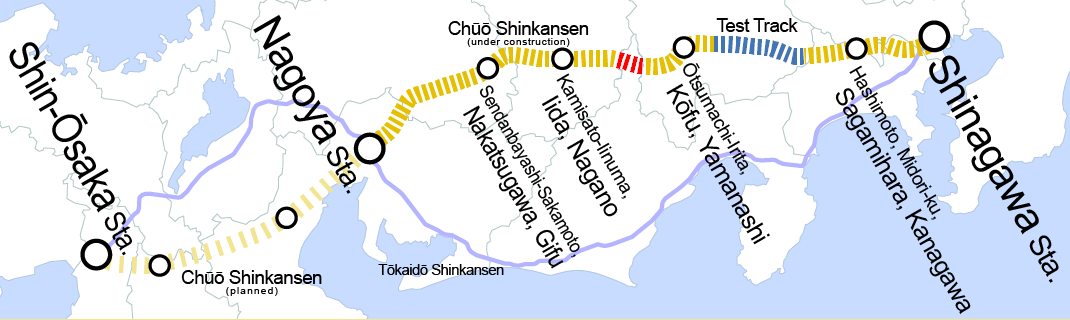

The Chūō Shinkansen (Japanese: 中央新幹線, Hepburn: Chūō shinkansen; lit. 'Central new trunk line') is a Japanese maglev line under construction between Tokyo and Nagoya, with plans for extension to Osaka. Its initial section is between Shinagawa Station in Tokyo and Nagoya Station in Nagoya, with stations in Sagamihara, Kōfu, Iida and Nakatsugawa. Following the completion of the Tokyo–Nagoya line, the line will extend to stations in Mie, Nara and Osaka. The line is expected to connect Tokyo and Nagoya in 40 minutes, and eventually Tokyo and Osaka in 67 minutes, running at a maximum speed of 505 km/h (314 mph). About 90% of the 286-kilometer (178 mi) line to Nagoya will be in tunnels.

The Chuo Shinkansen is the culmination of Japanese maglev development since the 1960s, a government-funded project initiated by Japan Airlines and the former Japanese National Railways (JNR). Central Japan Railway Company (JR Central) now operates the facilities and research. The line is intended to extend and incorporate the existing Yamanashi test track (see below). The trainsets are popularly known in Japan as linear motor car (リニアモーターカー, rinia mōtā kā), though there are many technical variations.

Government permission to proceed with construction was granted on 27 May 2011. Construction is expected to cost over ¥9 trillion Japanese yen (approximately $57 billion USD) and commenced in 2014. The start date of commercial service is unknown, after Shizuoka Prefecture denied permission for construction work on a portion of the route in June 2020. JR Central originally aimed to begin commercial service between Tokyo and Nagoya in 2027. However, in 2024, Central Japan Railway Co-President Shunsuke Niwa said that due to construction delays a 2027 opening was now impossible and it is not expected to open until at least 2034. Then in 2025, it was further pushed back to no earlier than 2035. The Nagoya–Osaka section was planned to be completed as late as 2045, but the date was moved to as early as 2037 following a loan from the Japanese government.

== Development overview ==
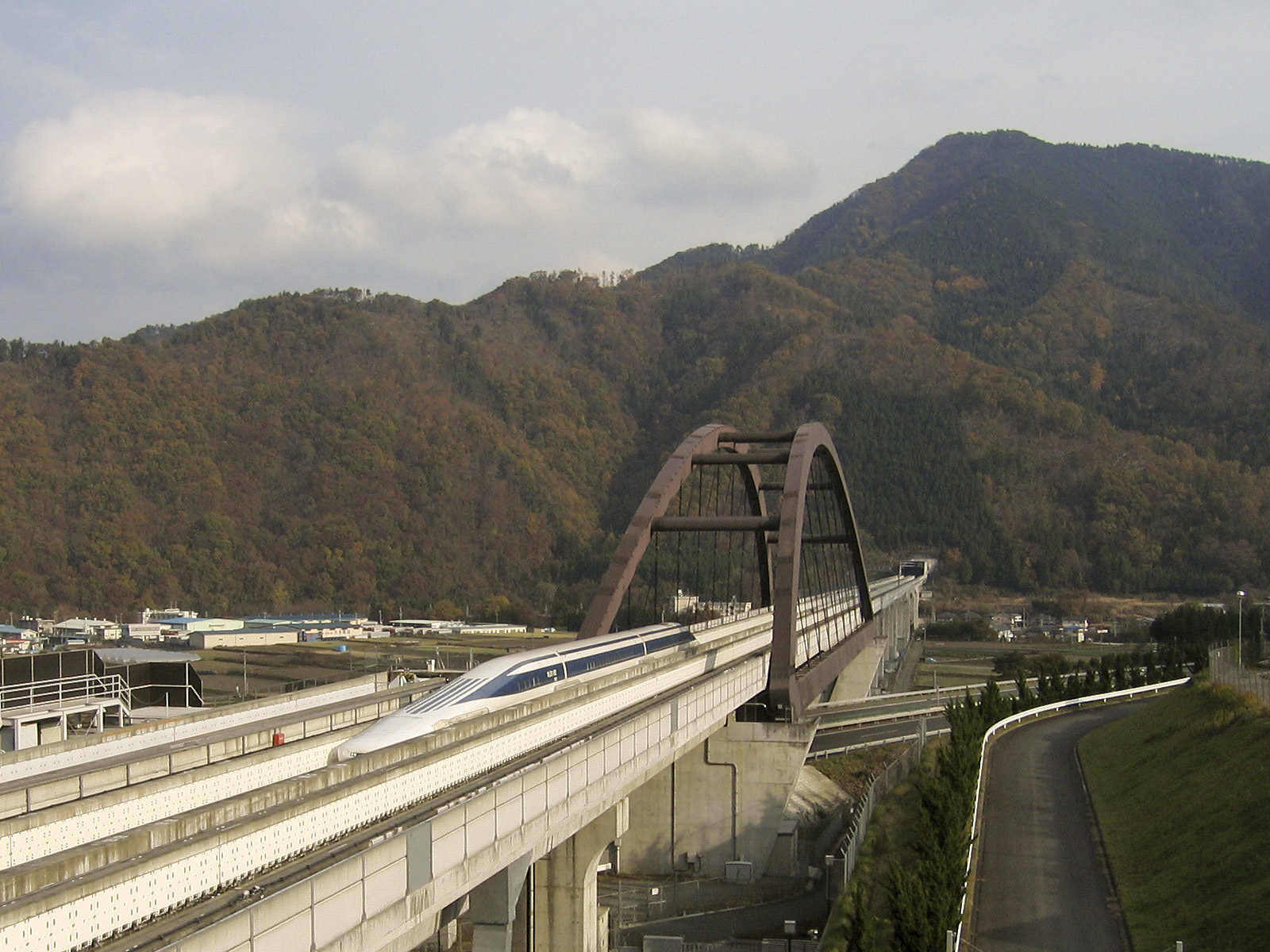
A maglev train on the Yamanashi Test Track, November 2005

=== Miyazaki and Yamanashi Test Tracks ===
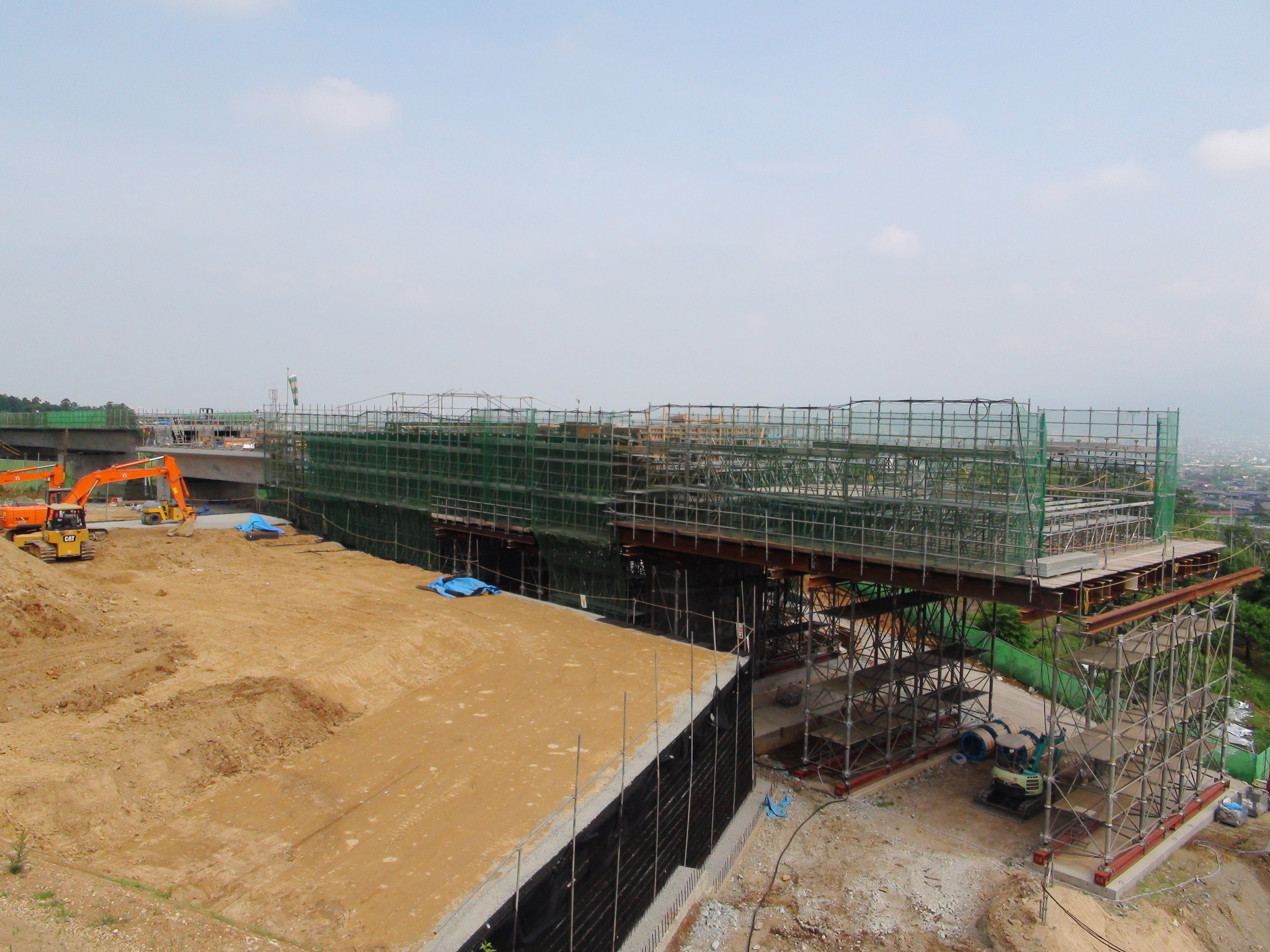
Yamanashi Test Track viaduct under construction in the city of Fuefuki in the Kofu Basin, July 2011

Following the opening of the Tokaido Shinkansen between Tokyo and Osaka in 1964, Japanese National Railways (JNR) focused on the development of faster Maglev technology. In the 1970s, a 7-kilometer (4.3 mi) test track for Maglev research and development was built in Miyazaki Prefecture. As desired results had been obtained at the (now former) Miyazaki test track, an 18.4-kilometer (11.4 mi) test track with tunnels, bridges and slopes was built at a site in Yamanashi Prefecture, between Ōtsuki and Tsuru (35.583°N 138.927°E). Residents of Yamanashi Prefecture and government officials were eligible for free rides on the Yamanashi test track, and over 200,000 people took part. Trains on this test track routinely achieved operating speeds of over 500 km/h (311 mph), allowing for a thorough test of the capabilities of the future Chuo Shinkansen.

The track was extended a further 25 km (15.5 mi) along the future route of the Chuo Shinkansen, to bring the combined track length up to 42.8 km (26.6 mi). Extension and upgrading work was completed by June 2013, allowing researchers to run tests at top speed over longer periods. The first tests on this longer track took place in August 2013. JR Central began offering public train rides at 500 km/h (311 mph) on the Yamanashi test track, via a lottery selection, in 2014. The train holds the world record for the fastest manned train on this track.

=== Routing ===
The line's route passes through many sparsely populated areas in the Japanese Alps (Akaishi Mountains), but is more direct than the current Tōkaidō Shinkansen route, and time saved through a more direct route was a more important criterion to JR Central than having stations at intermediate population centers. Also, the more heavily populated Tōkaidō route is congested, and providing an alternative route if the Tōkaidō Shinkansen were to become blocked by earthquake damage was also a consideration. The route will have a minimum curve radius of 8,000 m (26,000 ft), and a maximum gradient of 4%. This is more than the traditional Shinkansen lines, which top out at 3%.

The planned route between Nagoya and Osaka includes a stop in Nara. In 2012, politicians and business leaders in Kyoto petitioned the central government and JR Central to change the route to pass through their city. The governor of Nara Prefecture announced in November 2013 that he had re-confirmed the Transport Ministry's intention to route the segment through Nara.

JR Central announced in July 2008 that the Chūō Shinkansen would start at Tokyo's Shinagawa Station, citing difficulties in securing land at nearby Tokyo and Shinjuku stations for a maglev terminal.

Summary of the plans considered (Plan C was chosen)
Plan name	Route between Kofu and Nakatsugawa	Distance from Tokyo (km)		Construction costs (JPY) from Tokyo		Shortest journey time from Tokyo	
Plan name	Route between Kofu and Nakatsugawa	to Nagoya	to Osaka	to Nagoya	to Osaka	to Nagoya	to Osaka
Plan A	via Kiso Valley	334	486	5.63 trillion	8.98 trillion	46 minutes	73 minutes
Plan B	via Ina Valley (Chino, Ina, Iida)	346	498	5.74 trillion	9.09 trillion	47 minutes	74 minutes
Plan C	under the Japanese Alps and Iida City	286	438	5.10 trillion	8.44 trillion	40 minutes	67 minutes

A JR Central report on the Chuo Shinkansen was approved by a Liberal Democratic Party panel in October 2008, which certified three proposed routes for the Maglev. According to a Japan Times news article, JR Central supported the more direct route, which would cost less money to build than the other two proposals, backed by Nagano Prefecture. The latter two plans had the line swinging up north between Kōfu and Nakatsugawa stations to serve areas within Nagano. In June 2009, JR Central also announced research results comparing the three routes, estimating revenue and travel time, which showed the most favorable being the shortest Plan C, with long tunnels under the Japanese Alps. The Council for Transport Policy for the Ministry of Land, Infrastructure, Transport and Tourism concluded on 20 October 2010 that Plan C would be most cost-efficient. JR Central announced that one station would be constructed in each of Yamanashi, Gifu, Nagano, and Kanagawa Prefectures. On 31 October 2014, Japan's Ministry of Land, Infrastructure, Transport and Tourism approved Plan C for construction. Construction began on 17 December 2014.

Preparatory work at Nagoya station began in 2016. A skyscraper measuring 220 m (720 ft) in height was built by JR Central. The structure is named 名古屋駅新ビル ("Nagoya-eki Shin-biru", Nagoya Station new building) and accommodates a station for the maglev trains in its basement area.

== Construction schedule and costs ==
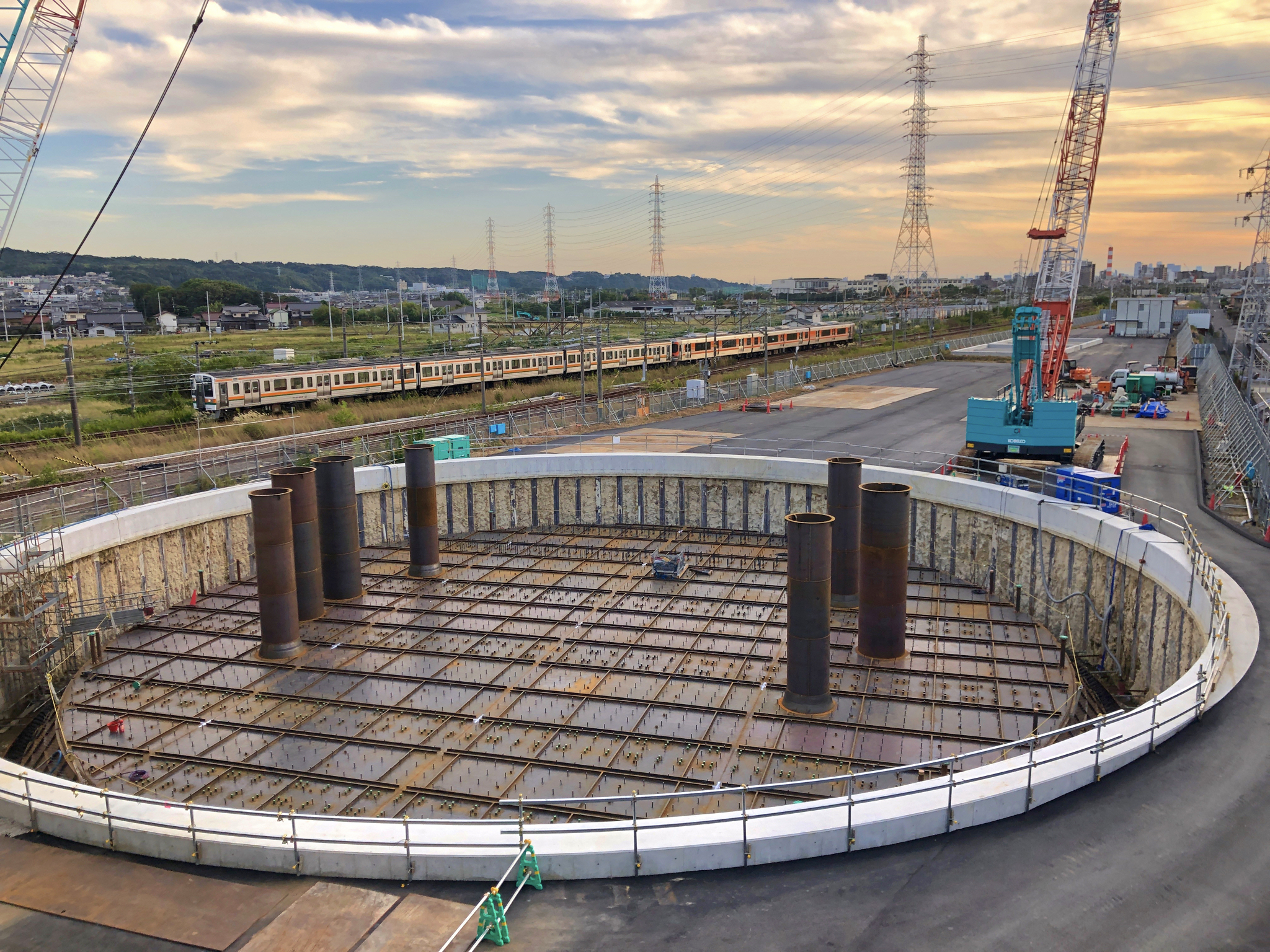
Construction of Chūō Shinkansen Jinryō Exit, in 2019

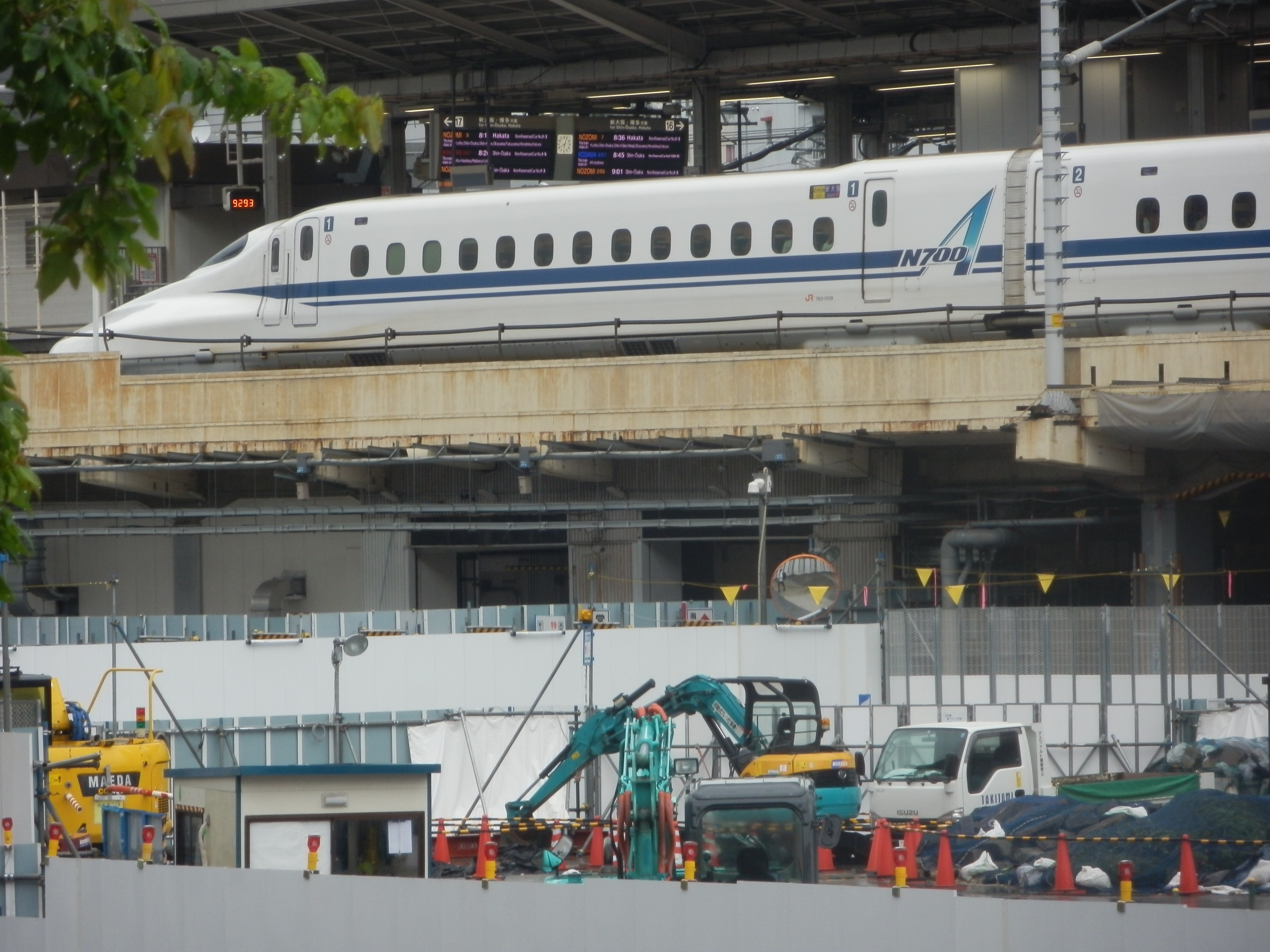
Construction work at Nagoya Station in 2019, showing the line's placement in relation to the existing Tokaido Shinkansen line

JR Central announced in December 2007 that it planned to raise funds for the construction of the Chuo Shinkansen on its own, without government financing. Total cost, originally estimated at 5.1 trillion yen in 2007, escalated to over 9 trillion yen by 2011. Nevertheless, the company has said it would be able to make a pre-tax profit of around 70 billion yen in 2026, when operating costs were predicted to stabilize. The primary reason for the project's huge expense is that most of the line is planned to run in tunnels (about 86% of the initial section from Tokyo to Nagoya will be underground) with some sections at a depth of 40 m (130 ft) (deep underground) for a total of 100 km (62 mi) in the Tokyo, Nagoya and Osaka areas.

The original construction schedule from 2013, which called for the Tokyo–Nagoya segment to open in 2027 and the Nagoya–Osaka segment to open in 2045, was designed to keep JR Central's total debt burden below its approximate level at the time of privatization (around 5 trillion yen). The schedule was later altered to bring forward the completion date of the Nagoya-Osaka segment to 2037, after JR Central received a loan from the Japanese government.

The first major contract announced was for a 7 km (4.3 mi) tunnel in Yamanashi and Shizuoka prefectures expected to be completed in 2025. Construction of a 25 km (16 mi) tunnel under the southern Japanese Alps commenced on 20 December 2015, approximately 1,400 m (4,600 ft) below the surface at its deepest point. The tunnel is expected to be completed in 2025, and upon completion will succeed the 1,300 m (4,300 ft) deep Daishimizu Tunnel on the Joetsu Shinkansen line as the deepest tunnel in Japan. Construction has also started in 2016 on the maglev station at Shinagawa. Being built below the existing Shinkansen station, and to consist of two platforms and four tracks, construction is planned to take 10 years, largely to avoid disruption to the existing Tokaido Shinkansen services located above the new station.

JR Central estimates that Chuo Shinkansen fares will be only slightly more expensive than Tokaido Shinkansen fares, with a difference of around 700 yen between Tokyo and Nagoya, and around 1,000 yen between Tokyo and Osaka. The positive economic impact of the Chuo Shinkansen in reducing travel times between the cities has been estimated at anywhere between 5 and 17 trillion yen during the line's first fifty years of operation.

=== Shizuoka Prefecture dispute ===
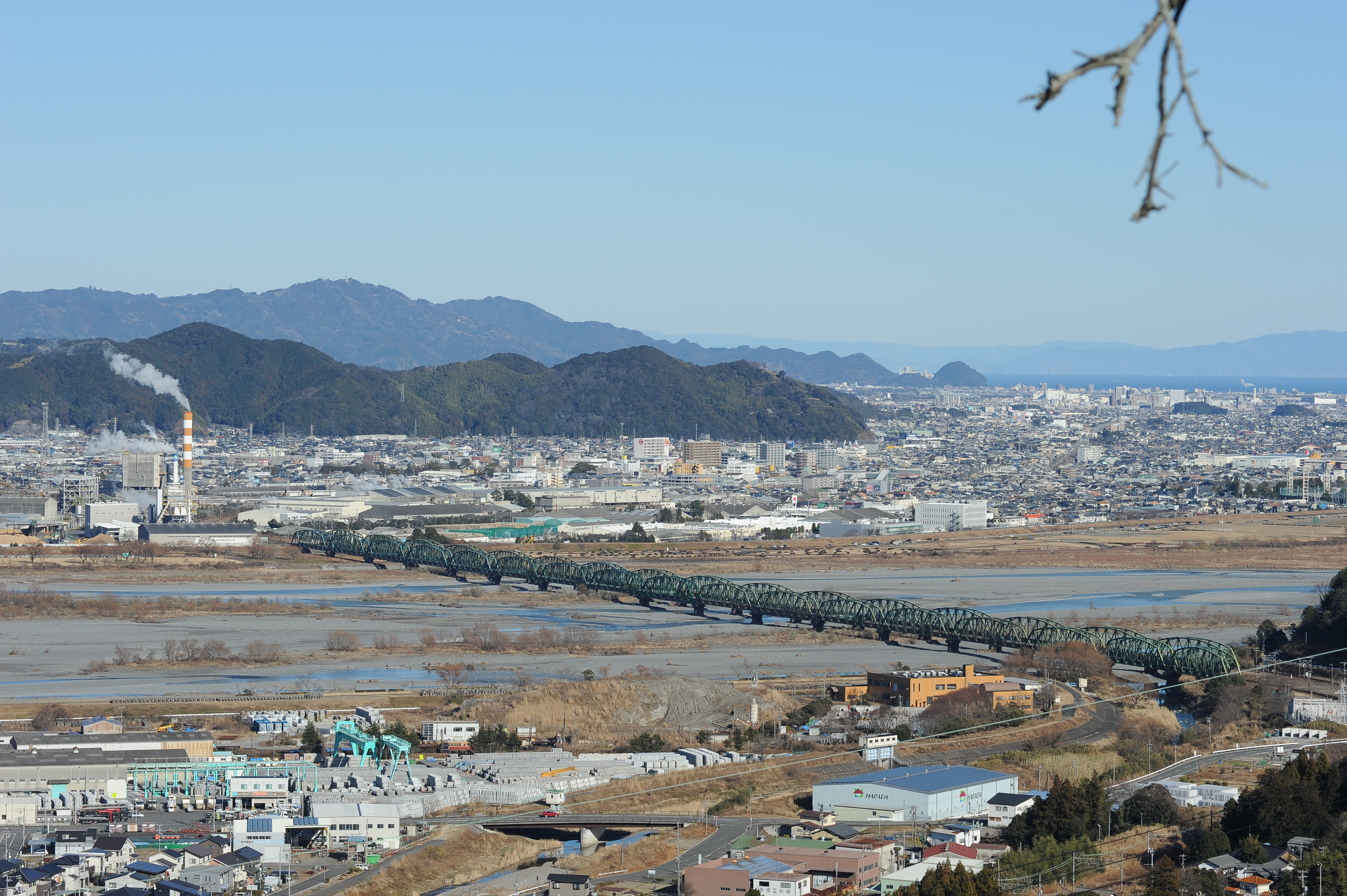
Ōi River

Construction is yet to commence on the part of the line going through Shizuoka Prefecture, as the municipality has expressed concern about water from the Ōi River leaking into the tunnel, lowering the water level. JR Central expressed concern early on that the delay in construction of the only 9 kilometer long section going through Shizuoka might throw the entire project off schedule.

Some political analysts believe that the actual reason for Shizuoka Prefecture's apparent concerns of the project is not over the Ōi River, but was merely used as a pretense to force JR Central's hand in building a train station on the Tokaido Shinkansen under Shizuoka Airport. Shizuoka Prefecture, being the only prefecture where no new station will be built, has long lobbied JR Central for years for the construction of such a station, with the line running directly under the airport. JR Central has so far refused, citing the close distance to the neighboring Kakegawa Station and Shizuoka stations. If constructed, travel time from the center of Tokyo to the airport would be comparable to that for Tokyo Narita Airport, enabling it to act as a third hub airport for the capital. As the station would be built underneath an active airport, it is expected to open after the new maglev line.

Officials of Shizuoka Prefecture, in a meeting with JR Central in June 2020, denied permission to begin construction work on the tunnel. JR Central announced the following week that it would be "difficult" to open the Tokyo-Nagoya line in 2027 as previously announced. The incumbent governor of Shizuoka Prefecture Heita Kawakatsu was re-elected in June 2021, partly on a platform of continued opposition to construction of the new line, barring further accommodations by JR Central.

Following a series of meetings between JR Central and Shizuoka Prefecture facilitated by the Ministry of Transportation, an interim report was released on the results of the meetings so far in late December 2021. Among other things, the report confirmed that while JR was committed to returning any water leaking into the tunnel once construction was completed, there is no known feasible way to return all of the water during the construction phase. However, it did also conclude that the amount of water leaked was likely to be insignificant.

Commenting on the report on 7 January 2022, the Shizuoka Prefecture governor expressed continued opposition to construction when it could result in water levels going down, even if only during construction. He urged JR Central to re-investigate the possibility of returning leaking water during construction. On 20 January, the prefecture officially called the report "insufficient", and announced that it still would not allow construction to commence.

During a routine press conference in December 2023, JR Central’s President Niwa announced an agreement with Tokyo Electric Power Company, the Ōi River's dam operator, to diminish the volume of water extracted from the upstream dam. This action aims to address the anticipated impact on the Oi River’s water levels, a consequence of the construction project. The agreement outlines the method of reducing water intake and the concept of compensation. The proposal was well-received and endorsed previously by the local governing council in November 2023.

Governor Kawakatsu announced on 2 April 2024 that he would be resigning after making statements criticised as being insulting towards certain professions. This came less than a week after JR Central's announcement that it would be unable to meet its goal of opening the Shinagawa-Nagoya section of the line by 2027. Kawakatsu's resignation was met with discussions about whether his successor would approve tunnel construction, triggering a slight rise in JR Central’s stock price. Yasutomo Suzuki, who won the May 2024 by-election,was hailed a "Maglev Proponent" by Nikkei Asia. The mayor of Nagoya, a city on the maglev, also said that Yasutomo Suzuki had a deep understanding of industry, so he thought Suzuki would get the project done quickly. Since the election, preliminary work has been approved and proceeding as of October 2024.

Shizuoka governor Yasutomo Suzuki and JR Central President Niwa signed a letter of agreement in January 2026 where JR will pay compensation for water resources, specifically covering any decrease in the Oi River without requiring the local government to prove it was caused by the construction. On 26 March, Shizuoka Prefecture's special committee approved all 28 environmental conservation measures proposed by JR Central, including those to reduce water consumption. JR Central began procedures to obtain consent from related municipalities, and Vice Governor Hiraki Sho commented that construction could now begin by the end of 2026. On 7 July 2026, Governor Suzuki announced that he would finalize the environmental conservation agreement with JR Central on 18 July, paving the way for the maglev's construction to begin in the prefecture. This would allow JR Central to begin the maglev service as early as 2036.

== Osaka extension ==
The government of Osaka Prefecture, as well as local corporations such as Suntory and Nippon Life, have raised concerns about the impact of the delayed construction of the Nagoya–Osaka segment on the Osaka economy. Politicians from the Kansai region called for, and received, state-backed loans for JR Central in order to expedite the line's construction, resulting in the opening of the extension being moved forward by up to 8 years.

== Construction accidents ==
On 27 October 2021, two construction workers died when part of the retaining wall of a temporary work tunnel collapsed. JR Central concluded that the safety checks carried out were insufficient, and vowed to make it clearer to workers which areas had and had not completed the safety checks necessary to allow for the presence of human workers going forward.

== Route ==
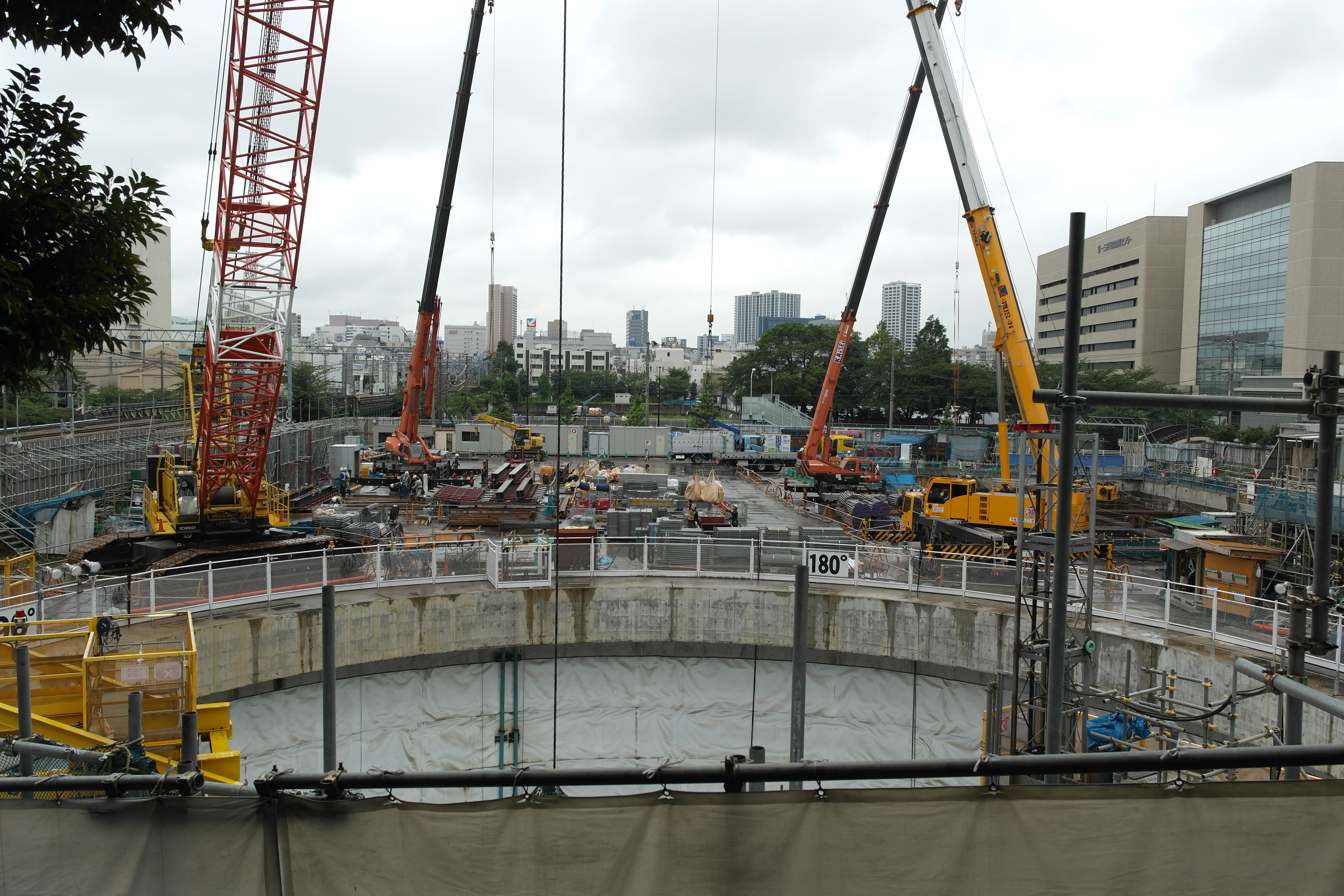
Construction work near Shinagawa Station in 2019

The line will run between Tokyo and Nagoya, with plans for an extension to Osaka. Its initial section is between Shinagawa Station in Tokyo and Nagoya Station in Nagoya, with stations in Sagamihara, Kōfu, Iida, and Nakatsugawa. The line has one station for each prefecture it passes through, except for Shizuoka. The line is expected to connect Tokyo and Nagoya in 40 minutes, and eventually Tokyo and Osaka in 67 minutes, running at a maximum speed of 500 km/h (311 mph).

About 90% of the 286-kilometer (178 mi) line to Nagoya will be in tunnels, with a minimum curve radius of 8,000 m (26,000 ft) and a maximum grade of 4% (1 in 25).

Chūō Shinkansen route
Station name (Note: All names for Prefectural stations are tentative.)	Distance from Shinagawa(km)	Connections	Location	Coordinates
Shinagawa Station	0.0	JR Central: Tōkaidō Shinkansen; JR East: Yamanote Line, Keihin-Tohoku Line, Tōkaidō Main Line, Yokosuka Line, Sobu Line, Ueno-Tokyo Line; Keihin Electric Express Railway: Keikyū Main Line; Tokyo Metro: Namboku Line (planned)	Tokyo	35°37′50″N 139°44′28.9″E
Hashimoto Station		JR East: Yokohama Line, Sagami Line; Keio Electric Railway: Sagamihara Line	Sagamihara, Kanagawa Prefecture	35°35′35.3″N 139°20′42.2″E
Yamanashi Prefecture Station			Kofu, Yamanashi Prefecture	35°36′19″N 138°33′41.6″E
Nagano Prefecture Station		JR Central: Iida Line (New Station Planned)	Iida, Nagano Prefecture	35°31′36″N 137°51′9.1″E
Gifu Prefecture Station		JR Central: Chuo Main Line	Nakatsugawa, Gifu Prefecture	35°28′47.2″N 137°26′51″E
Nagoya Station	285.6	JR Central: Tōkaidō Shinkansen, Tōkaidō Main Line, Chuo Main Line, Kansai Main Line; Nagoya Rinkai Rapid Transit: Aonami Line; Nagoya Municipal Subway: Higashiyama Line, Sakura-dōri Line; Meitetsu: NH Nagoya Main Line; Kintetsu Railway: E Kintetsu Nagoya Line	Nagoya	35°10′19.7″N 136°52′52.2″E
Mie Prefecture Station (near Kameyama Station)		JR Central: Kansai Line, Kisei Line JR West: Kansai Line	Kameyama, Mie Prefecture	34°51′01.1″N 136°27′01.6″E
Nara Prefecture Station (near Narayama Station)		JR West: Nara Line, Yamatoji Line	Nara	34°42′38.5″N 135°48′37.6″E
Shin-Osaka Station	438.0	JR Central: Tokaido Shinkansen; JR West: Sanyo Shinkansen, Hokuriku Shinkansen (planned), JR Kyoto Line, JR Kobe Line, JR Takarazuka Line, Osaka Higashi Line, Naniwasuji Line (planned); Hankyu Corporation (planned); Osaka Municipal Subway: Midosuji Line	Osaka	34°44′0.54″N 135°30′0.41″E

== Technology ==
The Chūō Shinkansen will employ the SCMaglev technology, a maglev (magnetic levitation train) system developed by JR Central. The levitating force is generated between superconducting magnets on the trains and coils on the track. The absence of wheel friction allows higher speed and higher acceleration and deceleration than conventional high-speed rail.

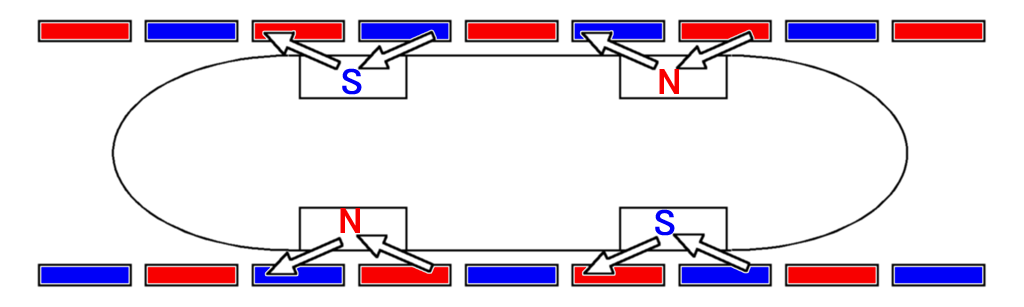
Schematic diagram of propulsion concept

The superconducting coils use Niobium–titanium alloy cooled to a temperature of −269 °C (4.15 K; −452 °F) with liquid helium. Magnetic coils are used both for levitation and propulsion. The trains are accelerated by alternating currents on the ground producing attraction and repulsion forces with the coils on the train. The levitation and guidance system, working with the same principle, ensures that the train is elevated and centered in the track.

=== Energy consumption ===
In 2018, a scientific comparison of the energy consumption of SCMaglev, Transrapid and conventional high-speed trains was conducted. The energy consumption per square meter of usable area was examined in relation to speed. The results show that there are only minor differences at speeds of 200 km/h and above. However, maglevs can reach much higher speeds than conventional trains. Conventional trains, on the other hand, require less energy at slow speeds, with this advantage shrinking or even slightly reversing during high-speed operation. As the Chūō Shinkansen mostly runs in tunnels, air resistance will be much higher than for most high-speed railways, significantly increasing energy consumption.

During normal operating conditions, the energy consumption of the L0 series between Tokyo and Osaka is estimated at 90-100 Wh/seat-km. For comparison, the conventional N700-series train operating on the fastest service-pattern on the existing line between Tokyo and Osaka has an estimated energy consumption of 70 Wh/seat-km.

Despite this increase, the L0 series still consumes much less energy than even the most efficient short/medium-haul modern passenger aircraft. For instance, the Airbus A319neo uses ~209 Wh/seat-km over a distance of 1,900 km. This figure would presumably be even higher for very short flights such as Tokyo-Nagoya, with much less time spent cruising. Moreover, the operation of the L0 series maglev train is completely electric, making it easier to transition to low-carbon energy sources.

== Rolling stock ==
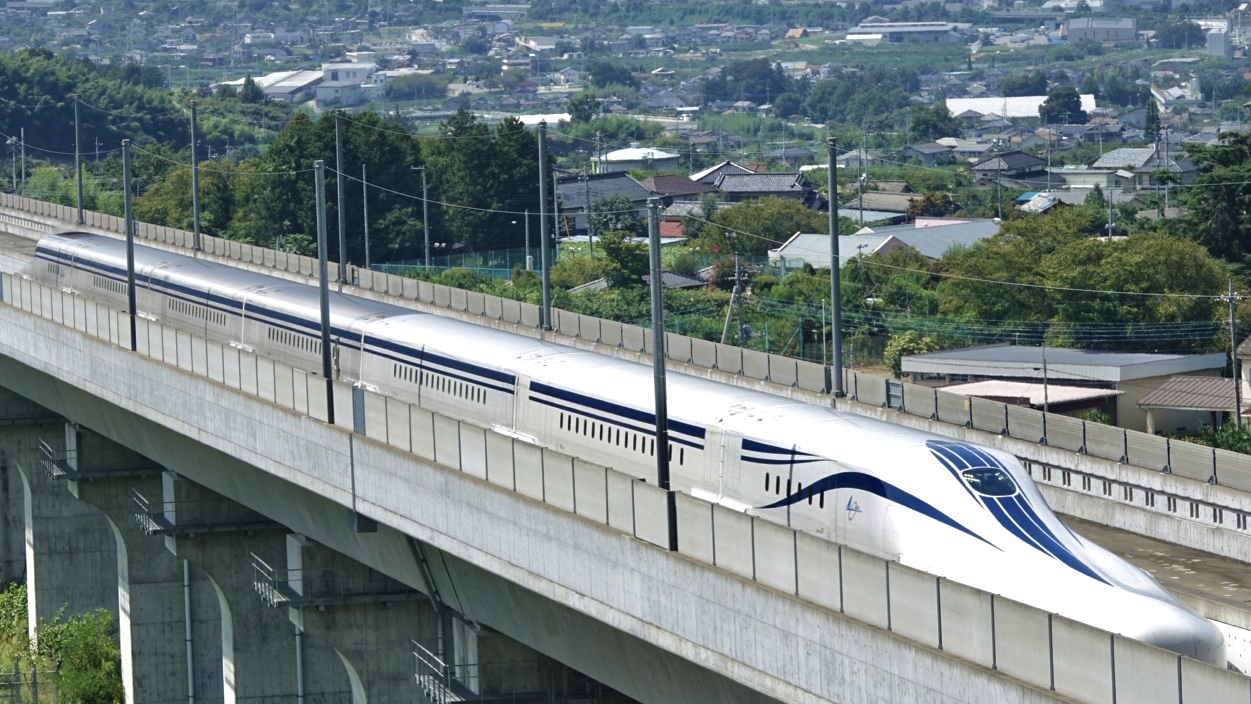
Improved L0 Series maglev train in August 2020

On 2 December 2003, MLX01, a three-car train set a world record speed of 581 km/h (361 mph) in a manned run. On 16 November 2004, it also set a world record for two trains passing each other at a combined speed of 1,026 km/h (638 mph).

On 26 October 2010, JR Central announced a new train type, the L0 Series, for commercial operation at 505 km/h (314 mph). It set a world record speed for a manned train of 603 km/h (375 mph) on 21 April 2015.

On 26 March 2020, the Improved L0 Series started operations on the test track. It represents the completion of 80–90% of the design goals for the final train, and is the first to draw power from the track. Previous models used on-board gas generators.

== See also ==
- Shinkansen
- Aérotrain
- Shanghai maglev train
- List of railway test tracks
