= Yusuke Nakano =

Japanese politician

- 中野 祐介

30th Mayor of Hamamatsu
- Incumbent
- Assumed office 1 May 2023
- Preceded by: Yasutomo Suzuki

Personal details
- Born: April 2, 1970 (age 56) Hamamatsu, Japan
- Party: Independent
- Education: University of Tokyo
- Profession: Politician

Yusuke Nakano (中野 祐介, Nakano Yusuke; born 2 April 1970) is a Japanese politician and governmental official currently serving as the Mayor of Hamamatsu. Prior to running as a candidate in the 2023 Hamamatsu mayoral election, Nakano worked within the Ministry of Internal Affairs and Communications.

== Early life ==
Yusuke Nakano was born on April 2, 1970, in Hamamatsu, Japan. He would attend and graduate from the University of Tokyo with a degree in economics. Later on, he would begin working with the Ministry of Internal Affairs and Communications and served as the Director of the General Affairs Department of Kyoto Prefecture.

== Political career ==
On November 14, 2022, Nakano announced his candidacy in the upcoming Hamamatsu mayoral election. In the election, Nakano ran as an independent, with the endorsement of the Liberal Democratic Party and Komeito. He also gained the endorsement of the previous mayor, Yasutomo Suzuki. Nakano successfully won the election and was elected as mayor.
