= 2023 Hamamatsu mayoral election =

Japanese local election

← 2019	9 April 2023	2027 →
- Turnout: 49.44%▼6.31%
Candidate	Yusuke Nakano	Atsumi Takami
Party	Independent	Independent
Popular vote	246,745	60,530
Percentage	80.3%	19.7%
Supported by	LDP, NKP	JCP
Mayor before election
Yasutomo Suzuki
Independent
Elected mayor
Yusuke Nakano
Independent

The 2023 Hamamatsu Mayoral Election was held on April 9, 2023, to elect the new mayor of Hamamatsu. It was held as part of the 2023 Japanese unified local elections.

The election saw newcomer candidate Yusuke Nakano, an independent with support from both the Liberal Democratic Party of Japan and Komeito, winning a landslide victory. He was opposed by Hiroshi Shimada, an independent supported by the Japanese Communist Party, with 19.7% of the vote.

Nakano and Takami were the only two candidates to run, with the incumbent mayor, Yasutomo Suzuki, refusing to seek re-election.
