= Nagano Prefecture Station =

Future railway station in Iida, Nagano Prefecture, Japan

Nagano Prefecture Station 長野県駅

General information
- Operator: JR Central
- Line: Chūō Shinkansen
- Platforms: 2 Island platforms
- Tracks: 4

Key dates
- Projected completion date: December 2031
Location

The Nagano Prefecture Station (Japanese: 長野県駅, Hepburn: Nagano-ken-eki) is a station under construction on the Chūō Shinkansen, which will be operated by JR Central. The station will be located in Iida, Nagano Prefecture.

== History ==
During the route selection for the Chūō Shinkansen, JR Central proposed the station in Nagano Prefecture be built in the town of Takamori. The prefecture requested that the line's station be built alongside the existing Iida Station. JR Central did not accept the request in 2011, and raised several other possible locations, including the northern part of Iida city. The construction of the station by Shimizu Corporation began on 22 December 2022. JR Central planned to use the arsenic-contaminated dirt from the nearby tunnel construction from 2026 to 2027, facing oppositions from locals concerned the dirt would contaminate the underground water. The construction is planned to be completed by December 2031, although JR Central estimates that the Chūō Shinkansen won't open until 2035.

== Details ==
The station will be elevated and have two island platforms with four tracks. Parking lots, emergency supplies warehouse, and commercial building will be built by the station, which is planned to be in service by 2028.
