= Yamanashi Prefecture Station =

Planned railway station in Kofu, Yamanashi Prefecture, Japan

Yamanashi Prefecture Station 山梨県駅

General information
- Operated by: JR Central
- Line: Chūō Shinkansen
- Platforms: 2 Island platforms
- Tracks: 4

Key dates
- Construction start date: 11 March 2026
- Projected completion date: 10 December 2031
Location

The Yamanashi Prefecture Station (Japanese: 山梨県駅, Hepburn: Yamanashi-ken-eki) is the tentative name for a planned station on the Chūō Shinkansen, which will be operated by JR Central. The station will be located in Kōfu, Yamanashi Prefecture.

The station is projected to be completed by 10 December 2031.

== History ==
The planned station's location in Ōtsu-machi, Kōfu was decided in 2011 as requested by Yamanashi Prefecture following consultations with local business organizations. JR Central signed contracts with Meiko Construction, Tekken, and Hayano to construct the station, and the surrounding viaducts on 17 September 2025. The construction is expected to start by the end of 2025, and is planned to be completed by 10 December 2031. Due to construction delays in Shizuoka Prefecture, the station will not be able to officially open for around four years until the entire line opens in 2035.

In February 2026, NHK reported that a ceremony to mark the start of station construction would be held the following month, with Yamanashi Prefecture Governor Kotaro Nagasaki in attendance.

== Details ==
The planned station will be elevated, with four tracks and two island platforms. The station will only be served by the Chūō Shinkansen, located about 3 kilometres (1.9 miles) away from the nearby Koikawa Station on the Minobu Line. There is a plan to connect the station to the Chūō Expressway by an interchange, and shuttle buses will connect the station to Koikawa Station and Kōfu Station.
