= 2024 Shizuoka Prefecture gubernatorial election =

2024 Shizuoka Prefecture gubernatorial
- 26 May 2024
- Turnout: 52.47%
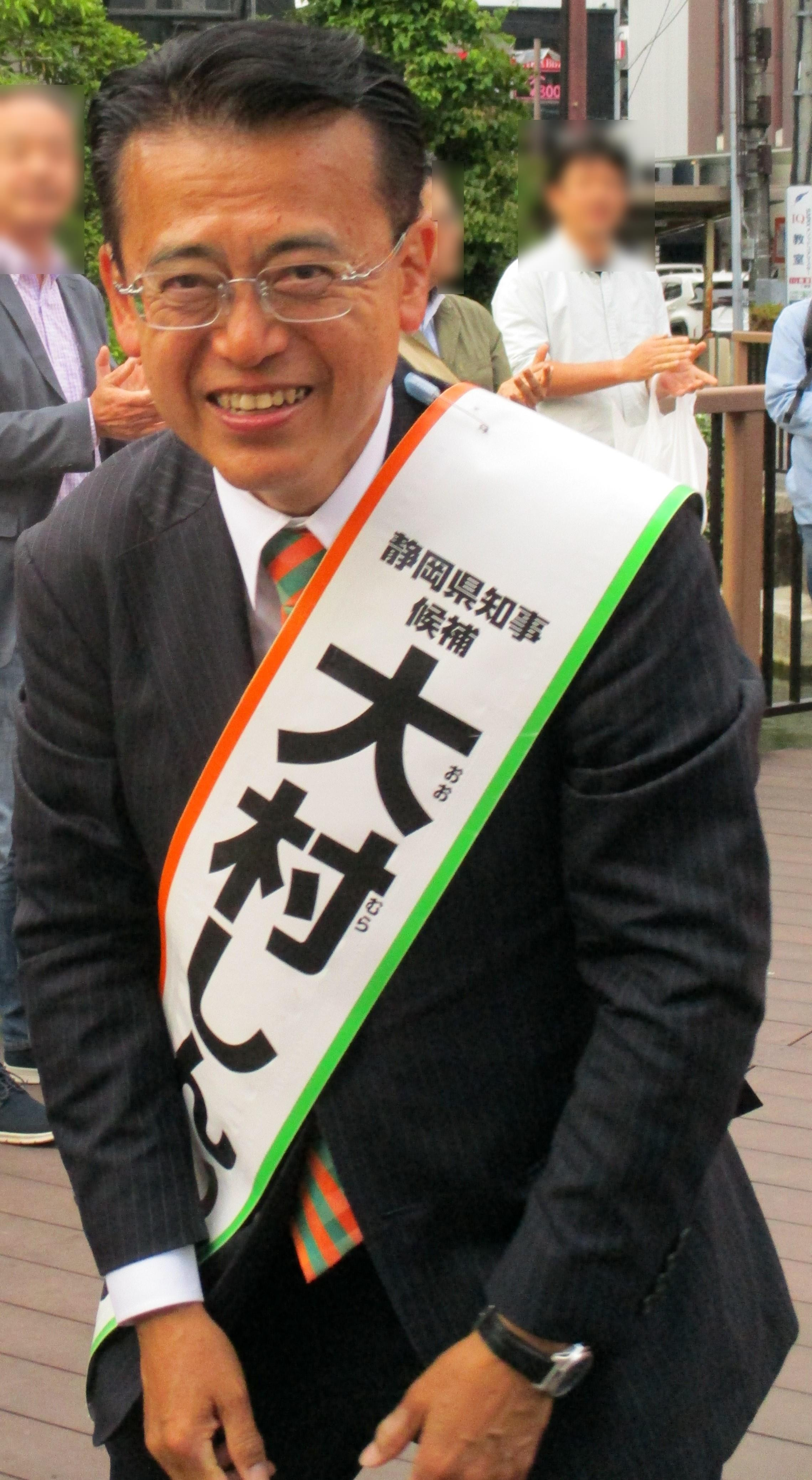
Candidate	Yasutomo Suzuki	Shinichi Omura	Daisuke Mori
Party	Independent	Independent	JCP
Popular vote	728,500	651,013	107,979
Percentage	47.42%	42.38%	7.03%
Supported by	CDP, DPFP, RENGO Shizuoka	LDP
Governor before election
Heita Kawakatsu
Independent
Elected Governor
Yasutomo Suzuki
Independent

The 2024 Shizuoka Prefecture Gubernatorial Election was an election to elect the governor of Shizuoka Prefecture in Japan, held on May 26, 2024.

== Background ==
Outgoing governor Heita Kawakatsu made several gaffes during his governorship. In 2021, the Shizuoka prefectural assembly advised him to resign after he said that the city of Gotemba "only has koshihikari" as its local specialty due to the slush fund scandal. In March 2024, he publicly ranked regions within the prefecture based on how "cultured" they were. He later refused to retract the statement claiming it was historically true. During a speech to newly-employed civil servants on 1 April 2024, he made derogatory remarks comparing employees of the prefectural government with "those who sell vegetables, take care of cows or create things." The resulting uproar led to him announcing his resignation on 2 April following the June prefectural assembly. However, he clarified on 3 April that he was resigning due to his opposition to the Chuo Shinkansen maglev route and not for his remarks, which he did not retract, although he apologized "for hurting the feelings of people working in the primary sector." Despite his original intent on resigning after June, he announced he will be resigning on April 10 after several complaints from the prefecture and among its employees. He stated the reason for the early resignation as he succeeded to delay the opening of maglev. He formally submitted his resignation on 10 April, which will become effective on 10 May and triggered an election to be held on 26 May.

== Key issues ==
Key issues in this election include the Chuo Shinkansen.

The winner, Yasutomo Suzuki, was called a "Maglev Proponent" by Nikkei Asia. The Mayor of Nagoya, a city on the maglev, said "Mr. Suzuki has a deep understanding of industry, so I think he will get the project done quickly."

== Candidates ==
Name	Age	Party	Past positions
Shinichi Omura	60	Independent (Note: Endorsed by the Shizuoka prefecture Liberal Democratic Party)	Former Vice Governor of Shizuoka Prefecture; Former Ministry of Internal Affairs and Communications; Advisor to Sumitomo Mitsui Trust Bank
Yasutomo Suzuki	66	Independent (Note: Endorsed by the Constitutional Democratic Party of Japan, Democratic Party for the People, RENGO Shizuoka)	Former member of the House of Representatives; Former Mayor of Hamamatsu; Yamanashi prefecture advisor
Daisuke Mori	55	Japanese Communist Party	Chairman of the Shizuoka Prefecture Committee of the Japanese Communist Party; Former Shimbun Akahata journalist Former social welfare corporation employee
Masafumi Yokoyama	56	Personal Dignity Party	Representative of the Personal Dignity Party; Investor; Formerly worked at a real estate management company

== Results ==
Yasutomo Suzuki won the election, garnering 728,500 votes and a 5% margin over his nearest rival, Shinichi Omura, who won 651,013 votes.
