= Yasutomo Suzuki =

Japanese politician (born 1957)

- 鈴木 康友
- Suzuki in 2021

Governor of Shizuoka Prefecture
- Incumbent
- Assumed office 26 May 2024
- Monarch: Naruhito
- Preceded by: Heita Kawakatsu

Mayor of Hamamatsu
- In office 1 May 2007 – 1 May 2023
- Preceded by: Yasuyuki Kitawaki
- Succeeded by: Yusuke Nakano

Member of the House of Representatives
- In office 25 June 2000 – 8 August 2005
- Preceded by: Ryū Shionoya
- Succeeded by: Multi-member district
- Constituency: Shizuoka 8th (2000–2003); Tokai PR (2003–2005)

Personal details
- Born: 23 August 1957 (age 69) Hamamatsu, Shizuoka, Japan
- Party: Independent
- Other political affiliations: Democratic
- Education: Keio University
- Profession: Politician

Yasutomo Suzuki (鈴木 康友, Suzuki Yasutomo; born 23 August 1957) is a Japanese politician who is the current governor of Shizuoka Prefecture.

== Early life ==
Suzuki graduated from Keio University in 1980.

== Political career ==
Suzuki served in the House of Representatives in the National Diet for two terms, between 2000 and 2005, as a member of the Democratic Party.

He was then elected as the mayor of Hamamatsu in 2007. After serving four terms in office, he declined to run for re-election in the 2023 Hamamatsu mayoral election.

Suzuki was elected governor in the 2024 Shizuoka Prefecture gubernatorial election as an independent endorsed by the Constitutional Democratic Party and the Democratic Party for the People.
