= 2024 Liberian by-elections =

The 2024 Liberian by-elections were held on April 23, 2024. The by-elections were the result of two vacancies: one in the Senate in Nimba County, the other in the House of Representatives, in Grand Gedeh County's 1st district.

== Background ==
The National Elections Commission (NEC) were notified of the vacancies in the legislature in early February. On February 1, the Senate notified the NEC of a vacancy due to the ascendancy of Nimba County Senator Jeremiah Koung to the vice presidency in the 2023 election. On February 2, the House notified the NEC of a vacancy due to the death of Grand Gedeh County Representative Erol Madison Gwion in December, shortly after the 2023 election. Gwion's death was the first death of the 55th Legislature. By February 14, the NEC had announced the date for the by-elections to be April 23.

Nimba County Senator Prince Johnson, founder of the Movement for Democracy and Reconstruction (MDR), had been building influence in the county since 2005, and his endorsements had a notable impact on its elections prior to 2024. In the 2023 presidential election, Johnson had aligned himself with Unity Party (UP) nominee Joseph Boakai, creating an alliance between the UP and the MDR. Koung's selection as Boakai's running mate was a part of this alliance. Koung was a member of the MDR who had been supported by Johnson throughout his political career. However, following Boakai's victory in the 2023 election, there had been a falling out between Senator Johnson and the Boakai administration. Johnson, a warlord in the First Liberian Civil War, was dissatisfied with Boakai's stance in favor of establishing a war crimes court.

As early as March, it was reported Senator Johnson was seeking to endorse a candidate opposed to the UP in the 2024 Senate election. The UP's candidate for the Nimba County Senate race was Nya D. Twayen Jr. Johnson initially wanted to support Mark Gblinwon, former Nimba County inspector, in the Senate race. He rejected the idea of endorsing Samuel G. Kogar. Early in Kogar's political, he was allied with Johnson, but the relationship between the two had deteriorated since then. In March, Senator Johnson had a meeting, first with Twayen and then with Kogar. In both meeting he was vetting potential endorsements. He supported Kogar's stance against the establishment of a war crime court. Johnson would end up endorsing Kogar. Vice President Koung would break from Senator Johnson with his endorsement of Twayen.

Campaigning for the election had begun on April 4. The Senate race had four candidates, the House race had 15. Candidates for the Senate race included Twayen with the UP and Kogar with the People's Unification Party. The other candidates were former senator Thomas Grupee with the Reformers National Congress and Armstrong Gobac Selekpoh with the Liberia National Union, a young critic of Johnson who enjoyed grassroots support. Candidates in Nimba County were noted to focus their campaigns on the interior of the county. Candidates in the House race included the late Rep. Gwion's son, Moniayoung Jerry Gwion, as well as the representative's widow, Amelia P. Beh. Campaigning ended on April 20.

== Aftermath ==
The 2024 by-elections were noted for their low turnout. The tally process began on April 24. In the first preliminary results released by the NEC, Twayen was in the lead, with Kogar in second place. On April 29, the NEC announced Twayen as the winner of the Senate race and independent Jeremiah Garwo Sokan Sr. as winner of the House race.

Twayen's victory was seen as an upset due to its defiance of Johnson's endorsement, but also due to racial factors. Twayen is of the Mano ethnicity, while Johnson and Kogar are Dan. There had been a number of upsets in Dan regions of Nimba County, with them supporting Twayen over Kogar. William Q. Harmon of the Liberian Observer suggested that the Senate election could signify a "potential shift in political dynamics in Nimba County and suggests a diminishing hold of power by Senator Johnson."

Twayen and Sokan were certificated as winners of the elections by the NEC on May 6.

== Results ==
The following are the results for the 2024 by-elections from the NEC.

2024 Nimba County Senatorial By-election
Candidate	Party	Votes	%
Nya D. Twayen Jr.	Unity Party	67,138	59.27
Samuel Gongben Kogar	People's Unification Party	41,196	36.37
Thomas S. Grupee	Reformers National Congress	3,685	3.25
Armstrong Gobac Selekpoh	Liberia National Union	1,250	1.10
Total		113,269	100.00
Valid votes		113,269	98.12
Invalid/blank votes		2,166	1.88
Total votes		115,435	100.00
UP gain from MDR			

2024 Grand Gedeh County's 1st House District By-election
Candidate	Party	Votes	%
Jeremiah Garwo Sokan Sr.	Independent	3,168	30.74
Amelia Polodee Beh	People's Unification Party	1,371	13.30
Ansu Dukuly	National Development Party	1,183	11.48
Sampson B. Williams	African Liberation League	757	7.34
Nathaniel Chen Gbaba	Reformers National Congress	617	5.99
Elijah Poneyon Dorbor	All Liberians Solidarity Party	476	4.62
Isaac Nyaneyon Kanneh	Liberia Restoration Party	452	4.39
Moniayoung Jerry Gwion	Democratic National Allegiance	443	4.30
Gabriel Papee Johnson	Liberian People's Party	433	4.20
Cyrus S. Cooper II	Vision for Liberia Transformation	424	4.11
Camille V. Charafeddine	Unity Party	389	3.77
Justice Randall Clarke	New Liberia Party	219	2.12
Jeziah M. Quiyea	Economic Freedom Fighters of Liberia	138	1.34
Watchen Ophelia Boley	Liberia Transformation Party	137	1.33
Roosevelt Johnson Jr.	Liberia National Union	100	0.97
Total		10,307	100.00
Valid votes		10,307	97.83
Invalid/blank votes		229	2.17
Total votes		10,536	100.00
IND gain from CDC			
