= Grand Gedeh-1 =

Electoral district in Liberia

- Constituency for the House of Representatives of Liberia
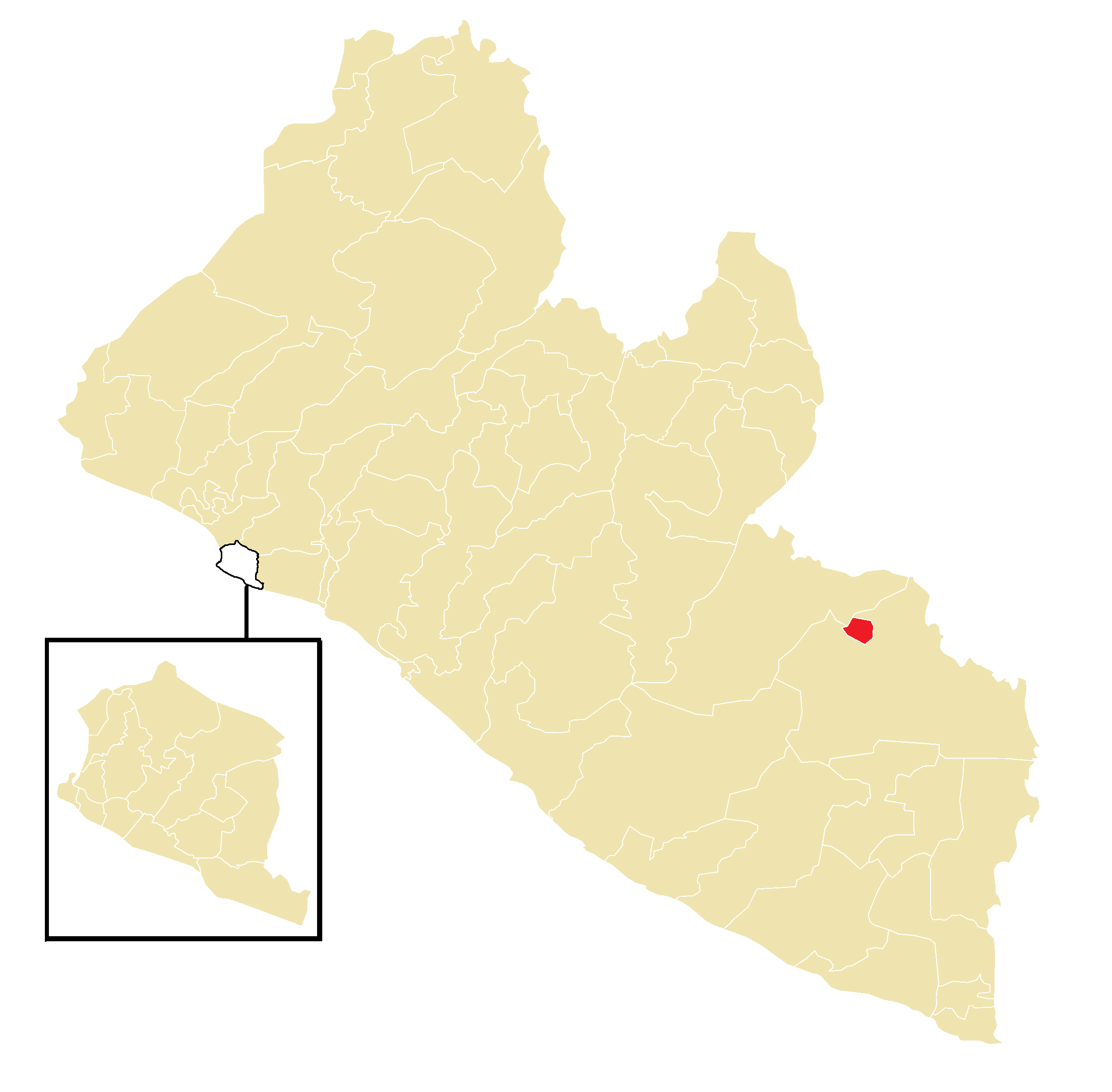
- Electorate: 20,407 (2023)

Current constituency
- Created: 2011
- Representative: Jeremiah Garwo Sokan Sr.

Grand Gedeh-1 is an electoral district for the elections to the House of Representatives of Liberia. The constituency covers Zwedru city.

== Elected representatives ==
Year	Representative elected	Party	Notes
2005	Rufus Wonblayon Gbieor	NDM	
2011	Zoe E. Pennue	Ind.	
2017	Zoe E. Pennue	Ind.	Resigned after elected to Senate.
2021	Erol Madison Gwion	LRP	
2023	Erol Madison Gwion	CDC	Died in office.
2024	Jeremiah Garwo Sokan Sr.	Ind.	

== Election results ==
2005 Grand Gedeh County's 1st House District Election
Candidate	Party	Votes	%
Rufus Wonblayon Gbieor	New Deal Movement	2,354	29.65
Kai-Matthew Whyee	Congress for Democratic Change	2,106	26.53
Jomael Nyonplu Glen	National Democratic Party of Liberia	1,726	21.74
William Surveyea Karyee	Coalition for the Transformation of Liberia	1,312	16.53
Brown Chayee Parjebo	Unity Party	441	5.55
Total		7,939	100.00
Valid votes		7,939	98.62
Invalid/blank votes		111	1.38
Total votes		8,050	100.00

2011 Grand Gedeh County's 1st House District Election
Candidate	Party	Votes	%
Zoe E. Pennue	Independent	5,851	57.07
Camille Vlendy Charafeddine	Congress for Democratic Change	3,057	29.82
H. Nyounkpao D. Funnebo	Unity Party	873	8.52
Erol Madison Gwion	Liberty Party	471	4.59
Total		10,252	100.00
Valid votes		10,252	94.63
Invalid/blank votes		582	5.37
Total votes		10,834	100.00

2017 Grand Gedeh County's 1st House District Election
Candidate	Party	Votes	%
Zoe E. Pennue (Incumbent)	Independent	8,499	55.74
Jeremiah Garwo Sokan Sr.	Independent	3,166	20.76
Camille V. Charafeddine	Liberty Party	1,091	7.16
Erol Madison Gwion	Coalition for Democratic Change	1,003	6.58
Elijah P. Dorbor	Movement for Economic Empowerment	423	2.77
Lawson V. Barh	All Liberian Party	298	1.95
Christopher Beh Bailey	Unity Party	263	1.72
Randolph Yonkpao Saydee	Liberia Transformation Party	167	1.10
Cyrus S. Cooper II	United People's Party	153	1.00
Sleekey Barbah Kaba	Alternative National Congress	117	0.77
Justice R. Clarke	Vision for Liberia Transformation	68	0.45
Total		15,248	100.00
Valid votes		15,248	96.07
Invalid/blank votes		624	3.93
Total votes		15,872	100.00

2021 Grand Gedeh County's 1st House District By-election
Candidate	Party	Votes	%
Erol Madison Gwion	Liberia Restoration Party	3,404	47.58
Jeremiah Garwo Sokan Sr.	Coalition for Democratic Change	2,698	37.71
Ansu Dukuly	Collaborating Political Parties	494	6.91
Seward Sohn	Liberia National Union	199	2.78
George Nyan Yah	Rainbow Alliance	181	2.53
Fester Jarbah Saydee	People's Unification Party	178	2.49
Total		7,154	100.00
Valid votes		7,154	97.31
Invalid/blank votes		198	2.69
Total votes		7,352	100.00

2024 Grand Gedeh County's 1st House District By-election
Candidate	Party	Votes	%
Jeremiah Garwo Sokan Sr.	Independent	3,168	30.74
Amelia Polodee Beh	People's Unification Party	1,371	13.30
Ansu Dukuly	National Development Party	1,183	11.48
Sampson B. Williams	African Liberation League	757	7.34
Nathaniel Chen Gbaba	Reformers National Congress	617	5.99
Elijah Poneyon Dorbor	All Liberians Solidarity Party	476	4.62
Isaac Nyaneyon Kanneh	Liberia Restoration Party	452	4.39
Moniayoung Jerry Gwion	Democratic National Allegiance	443	4.30
Gabriel Papee Johnson	Liberian People's Party	433	4.20
Cyrus S. Cooper II	Vision for Liberia Transformation	424	4.11
Camille V. Charafeddine	Unity Party	389	3.77
Justice Randall Clarke	New Liberia Party	219	2.12
Jeziah M. Quiyea	Economic Freedom Fighters of Liberia	138	1.34
Watchen Ophelia Boley	Liberia Transformation Party	137	1.33
Roosevelt Johnson Jr.	Liberia National Union	100	0.97
Total		10,307	100.00
Valid votes		10,307	97.83
Invalid/blank votes		229	2.17
Total votes		10,536	100.00
