= Erol Madison Gwion =

Liberian politician (1964–2023)

Erol Madison Gwion Sr. (November 25, 1964 – December 4, 2023) was a Liberian politician.

== Biography ==
Gwion was born on November 25, 1964.

Gwion was a member of the Coalition for Democratic Change (CDC). In the 2021 by-election, Gwion contested Grand Gedeh County's 1st district seat in the House of Representatives of Liberia with the Liberia Restoration Party. In this election, he defeated the ruling party CDC candidate Jeremiah Garwo Sokan. In April 2022, Gwion established the District Development Council. He claimed to donate fifty percent of his salary to the organization, which sought, according to FrontPage Africa, to contribute "to community empowerment and development".

In July 2023, ahead of the October House elections, Gwion returned to the CDC. By this time he was serving as secretary general of the Grand Gedeh County Legislative Caucus. In mid-2023, Gwion suffered an illness which prevented him from campaigning for his re-election. In 2023 House election, Gwion was re-elected regardless. In November 2023, false rumours on social media had been spread that Gwion died. Gwion died on December 4, at the age of 59. Some sources say he was in Accra, Ghana, others claim he was in India. The election was set to be certified on December 8.

Following confirmation of Gwion's death, a group of young supporters of Gwion set fire to Grand Gedeh County Senator Zoe Emmanuel Pennoh's house in Zwedru on December 5. There were accusations against Senator Pennoh, claiming he was involved in Gwion's death. He has denied the allegations. The police reported calm returned to the area after eight hours.
