= Heita Kawakatsu =

Former Japanese politician

- 川勝 平太
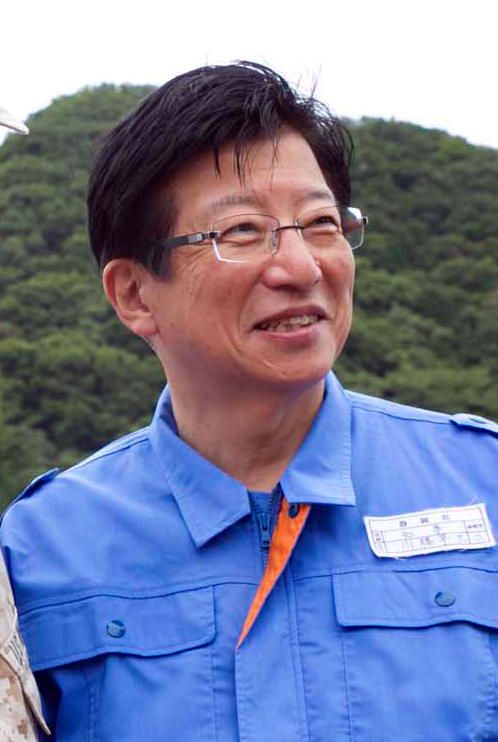
- Kawakatsu in 2014

Governor of Shizuoka Prefecture
- In office 7 July 2009 – 10 May 2024
- Monarchs: Akihito; Naruhito
- Preceded by: Yoshinobu Ishikawa
- Succeeded by: Yasutomo Suzuki

Personal details
- Born: 16 August 1948 (age 78) Osaka, Japan
- Party: Independent
- Education: Waseda University; University of Oxford

Heita Kawakatsu (川勝 平太, Kawakatsu Heita; born 16 August 1948) was the governor of Shizuoka Prefecture from 2009 to 2024.

== Education ==
He completed his D.Phil. at Wolfson College, Oxford, under Professor Peter Mathias and was Professor of Economics History at Waseda University, Tokyo. He was also Professor of Economics History and Vice Director of the International Research Centre for Japanese Studies in Kyoto and President at Shizuoka University of Arts and culture. He is co-editor of many studies including Intra-Asian Trade and Industrialization and The Evolving Structure of the East Asian Economic System since 1700, both published by Routledge.

== Career ==
A former economic historian, Kawakatsu was a professor at the International Research Center for Japanese Studies in Kyoto from 1998 to 2007. Kawakatsu's research on "civilization theory" has been critiqued by historians such as Tessa Morris-Suzuki.

He is opposed to the plan of Tokyo-Nagoya MagLev route in terms of ecological system and water supply, and most importantly to protest against JR Tokai's Nozomi service passing the whole prefecture, and also to disrupt the economical growth of the country. This opposition against the construction resulted in numerous condemnations and complaints, after the route was forced to postpone its completion.

== Gaffes and resignation ==
Kawakatsu has made several gaffes during his governorship. In October 2020, he publicly insulted then-prime minister Yoshihide Suga as "undereducated" during a press conference on 7 October 2020 after the government refused to enlist six people endorsed by the Science Council of Japan. and traveled to Karuizawa, Nagano despite the prefectural government's advise against travelling during the COVID-19 pandemic in December 2020. In 2021, the Shizuoka prefectural assembly advised him to resign after he said that the city of Gotemba "only has koshihikari" as its local specialty. In March 2024, he publicly ranked regions within the prefecture based on how "cultured" they were. He later refused to retract the statement claiming it was historically true.

During a speech to newly employed civil servants on 1 April 2024, he made derogatory remarks comparing employees of the prefectural government with "those who sell vegetables, take care of cows or create things." The resulting uproar led to him announcing his resignation on 2 April following the June prefectural assembly. However, he clarified on 3 April that he was resigning due to his opposition to the Tokyo-Nagoya MagLev route and not for his remarks, which he did not retract, although he apologized "for hurting the feelings of people working in the primary sector." Despite his original intent on resigning after June to receive bonuses, he announced he will be resigning on 10 April after numerous complaints from the prefecture and among its employees. He stated the reason for the early resignation as he succeeded to delay the opening of Chūō Shinkansen. He formally submitted his resignation on 10 April, which will become effective on 10 May and triggered an election to be held on 26 May. Even with his resignation, he still claimed to support the construction of Chuō Shinkansen, although this also received backlash due to his actions as governor. When asked by newspapers how he felt about resigning, he recited a poem by Hosokawa Gracia.
