= 2024 Orange County Board of Supervisors election =

2024 Orange County Board of Supervisors elections
- March 5, 2024; November 5, 2024 (runoff); Officially nonpartisan

2 of 5 seats on the Orange County Board of Supervisors
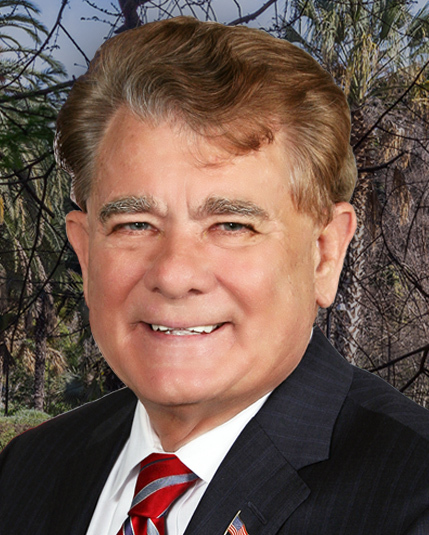

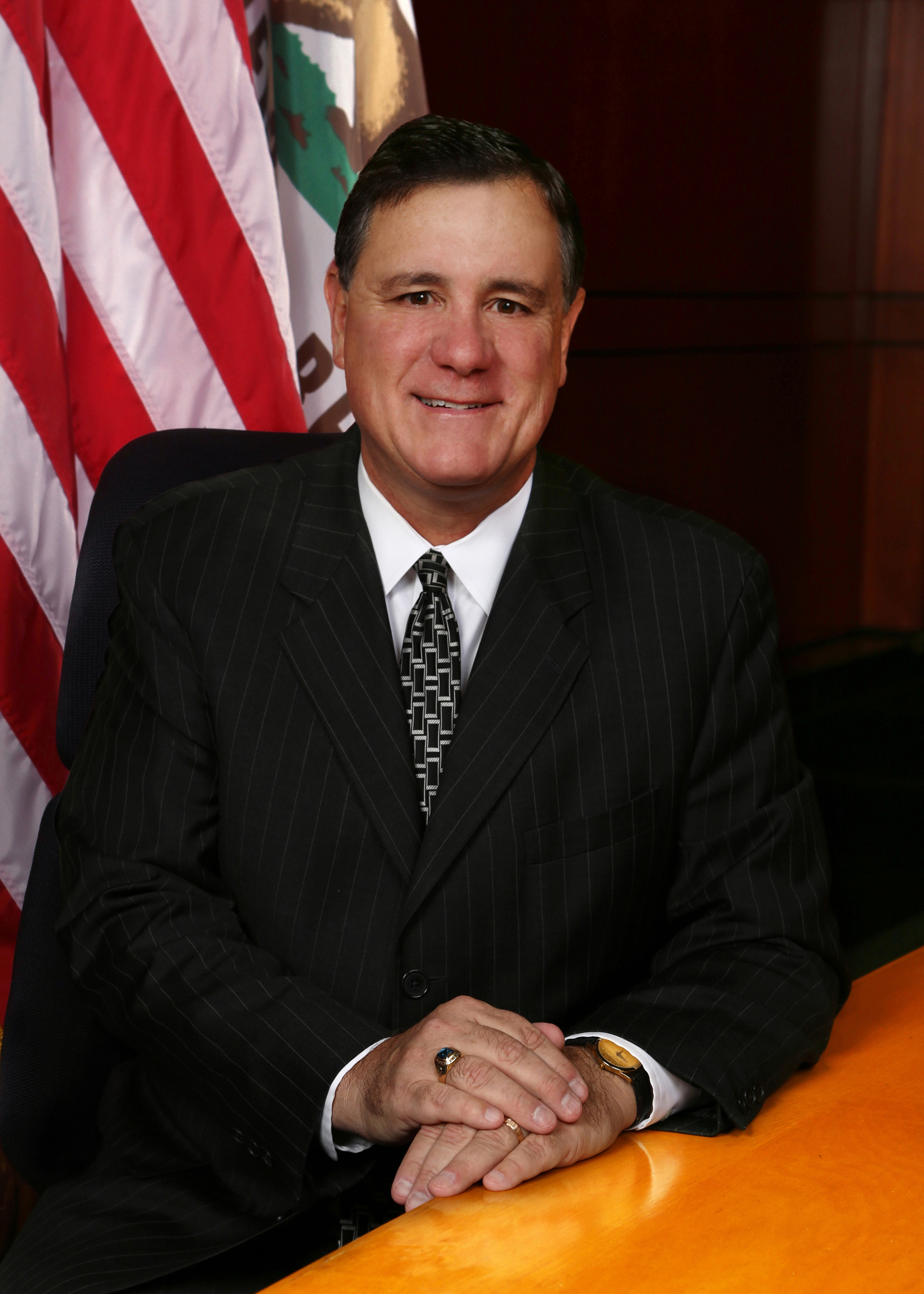
	Majority party	Minority party
Leader	Doug Chaffee	Donald P. Wagner
Party	Democratic	Republican
Last election	3 seats, 75.67%	2 seats, 24.33%
Seats before	3	2
Seats won	0	2
Seats after	3	2
Seat change	Steady	Steady
Popular vote	157,503	257,742
Percentage	37.93%	62.07%
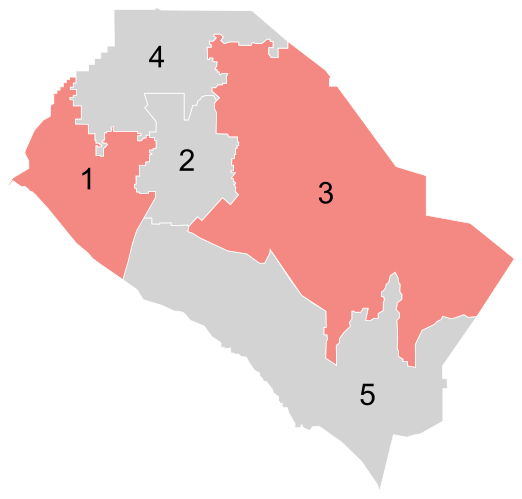
- Winners: Republican hold No election
Chair of the Board of Supervisors before election
Donald P. Wagner
Elected Chair of the Board of Supervisors
Doug Chaffee

The 2024 Orange County Board of Supervisors elections were held on March 5, 2024 (for general elections) and November 5, 2024 (for runoff elections). Two Board of Supervisors seats (districts 1 and 3) are the only county offices up for election in presidential years. The other county supervisorial district seats (districts 2, 4, and 5) and countywide offices are up for election in midterm years. County elections in California are officially nonpartisan.

== Background ==
The 2024 Orange County Board of Supervisors elections were held on March 5, 2024 (for general elections) and November 5, 2024 (for runoff elections). Local elections in California are officially nonpartisan.

Two of the five seats of the Orange County, California Board of Supervisors were up for election. The Democratic Party currently holds three seats on the board, while the Republican Party holds two.

County elections in California are officially nonpartisan. The parties below identify which party label each candidate would have run under if given the option.

== District 1 ==
2024 Orange County Board of Supervisors District 1 election
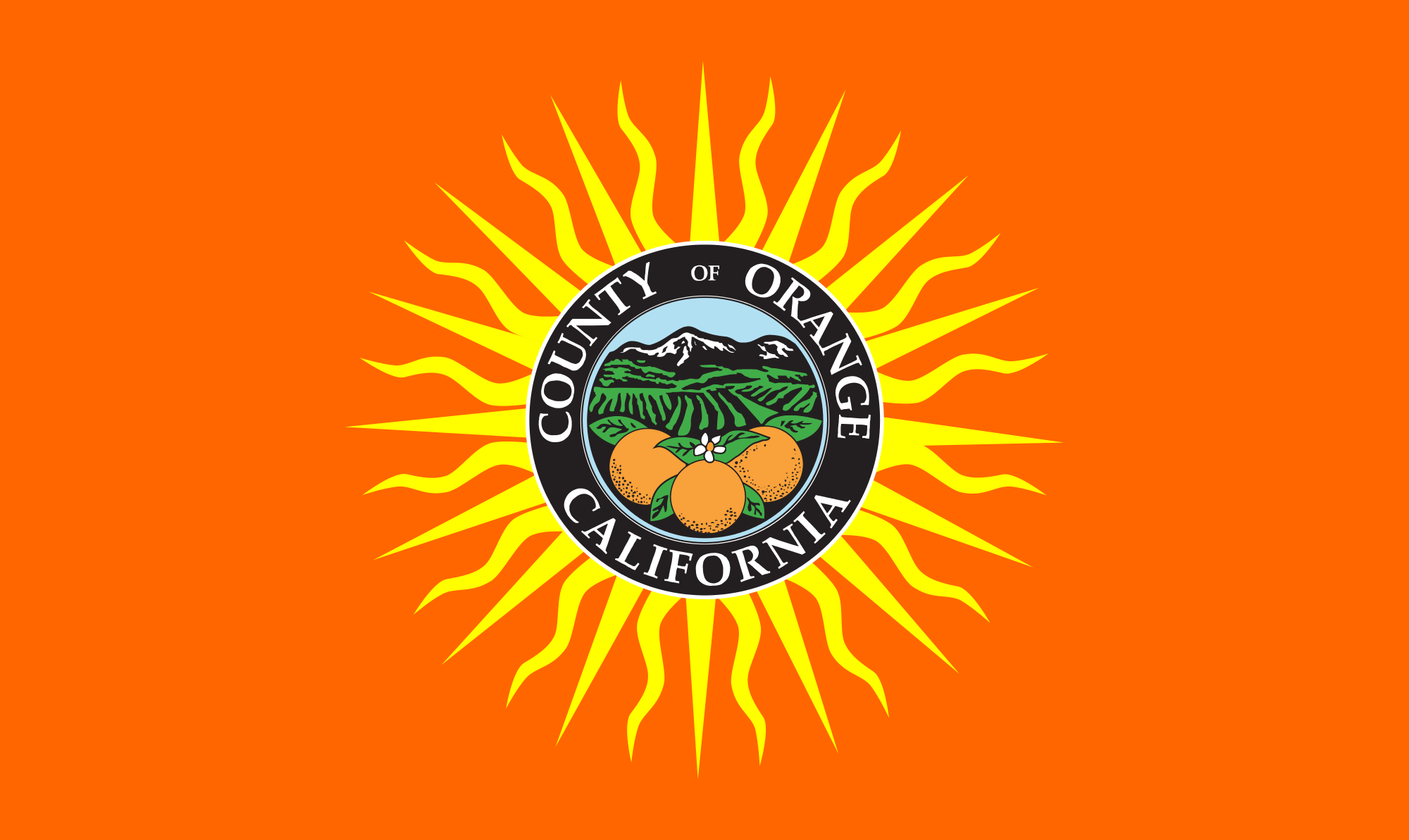
- March 5 and November 5, 2024
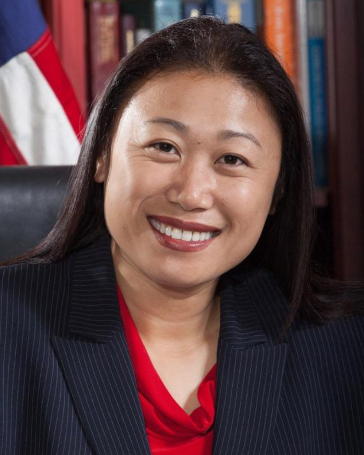

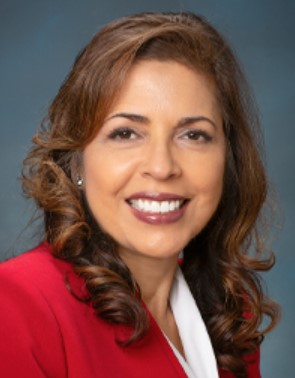

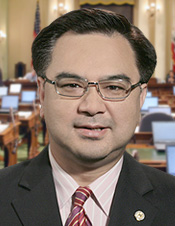

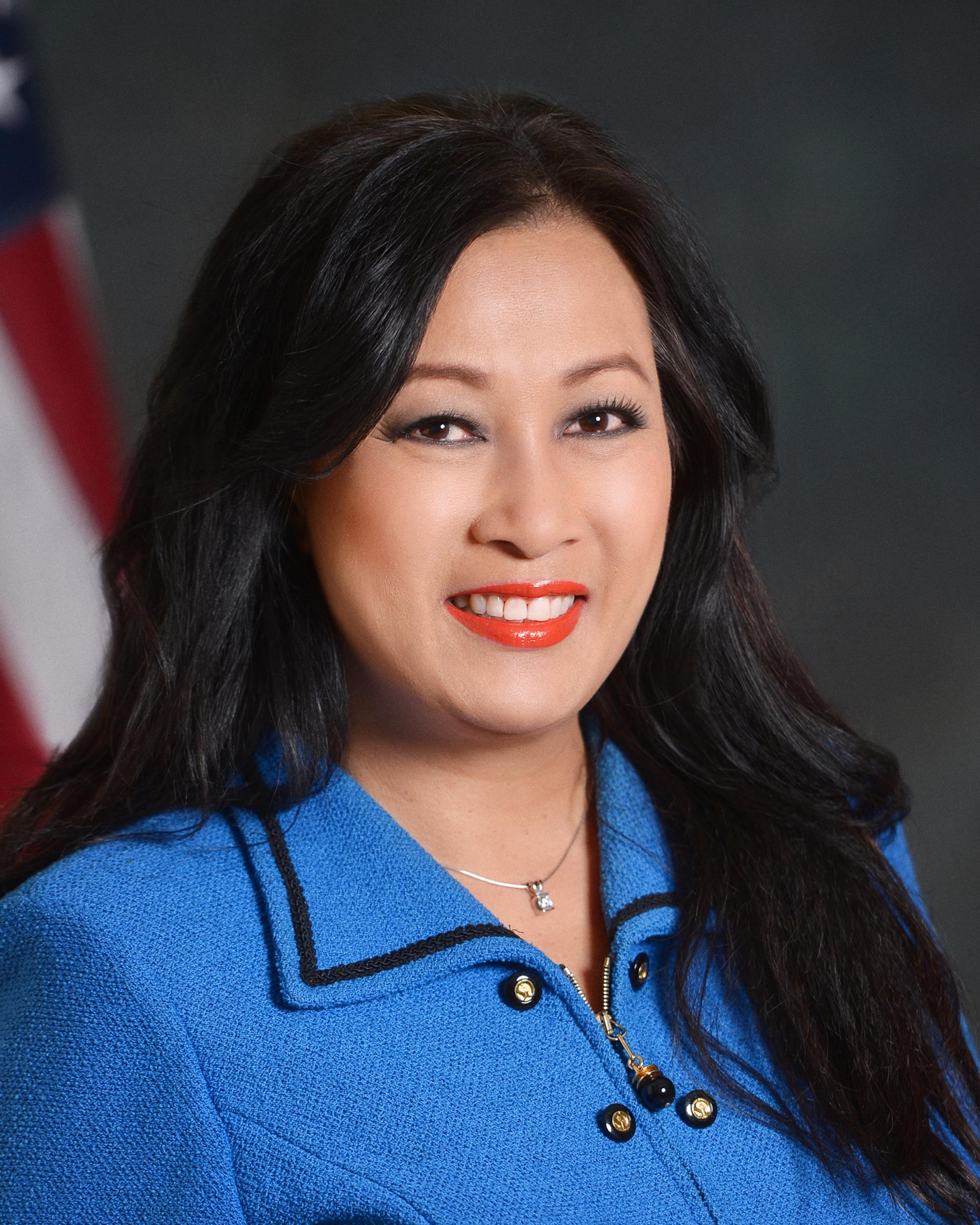

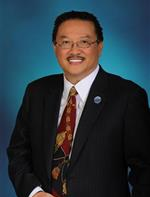
Candidate	Janet Nguyen	Frances Marquez	Van Tran
First round	59,702; 43.46%	35,687; 25.98%	24,717; 17.99%
Runoff	160,036; 61.2%	101,296; 38.8%	Eliminated
Candidate	Kimberly Ho	Michael Vo
First round	8,683; 6.32%	8,599; 6.26%
Runoff	Eliminated	Eliminated
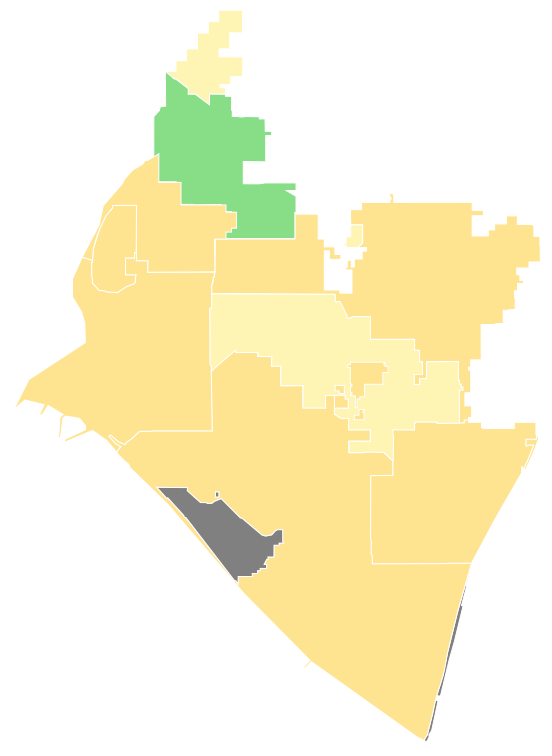
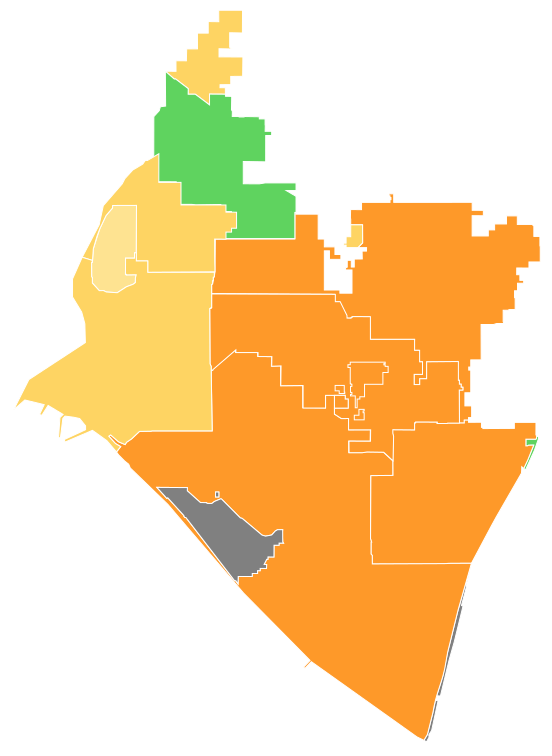
- Nguyen: 30–40% 40–50% Marquez: 40–50% No votes: Nguyen: 50–60% 60–70% Marquez: 50–60% No votes
Supervisor before election
Andrew Do
Elected Supervisor
Janet Nguyen

The 1st district includes Huntington Beach, as well as Fountain Valley, Seal Beach, Westminster, and most of Garden Grove. Incumbent Andrew Do, a Republican, was term-limited and ineligible to run for a third term.

=== Candidates ===
==== Advanced ====
- Janet Nguyen (Republican), California state senator and former Orange County supervisor
- Frances Marquez (Democratic), Cypress city councilor

==== Eliminated in first round ====
- Kimberly Ho (Republican), Westminster city councilor
- Van Tran (Republican), member of the Orange County Water District Board of Directors, chief of staff to incumbent Andrew Do, and former California state representative
- Michael Vo (Republican), former mayor of Fountain Valley and candidate for the 2nd district in 2021

=== Endorsements ===
Janet Nguyen (R)

Newspapers

- Orange County Register

=== General election ===
General election results
Candidate	Votes	%
Janet Nguyen	59,702	43.46
Frances Marquez	35,687	25.98
Van Tran	24,717	17.99
Kimberly Ho	8,683	6.32
Michael Vo	8,599	6.26
Total votes	137,388	100%

==== Runoff ====
Because no candidate received a majority of the vote in the first round in March, State Senator Janet Nguyen and Cypress city council member Frances Marquez advanced to a runoff, which was held on November 5, 2024. Nguyen was elected with 61.2 percent of the vote.

Runoff results
Candidate	Votes	%
Janet Nguyen	160,036	61.2
Frances Marquez	101,296	38.8
Total votes		

== District 3 ==
2024 Orange County Board of Supervisors District 3 election
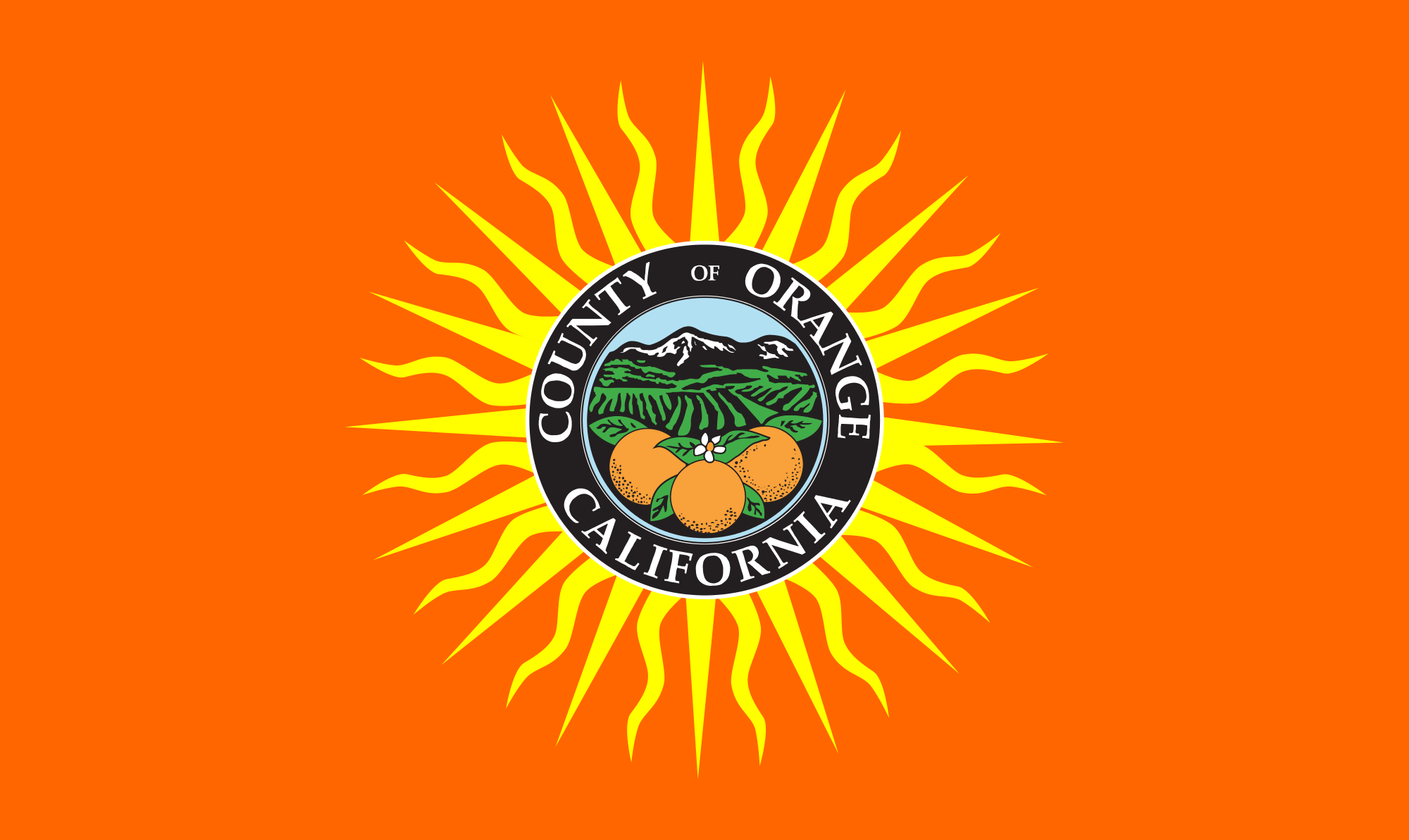
- March 5, 2024
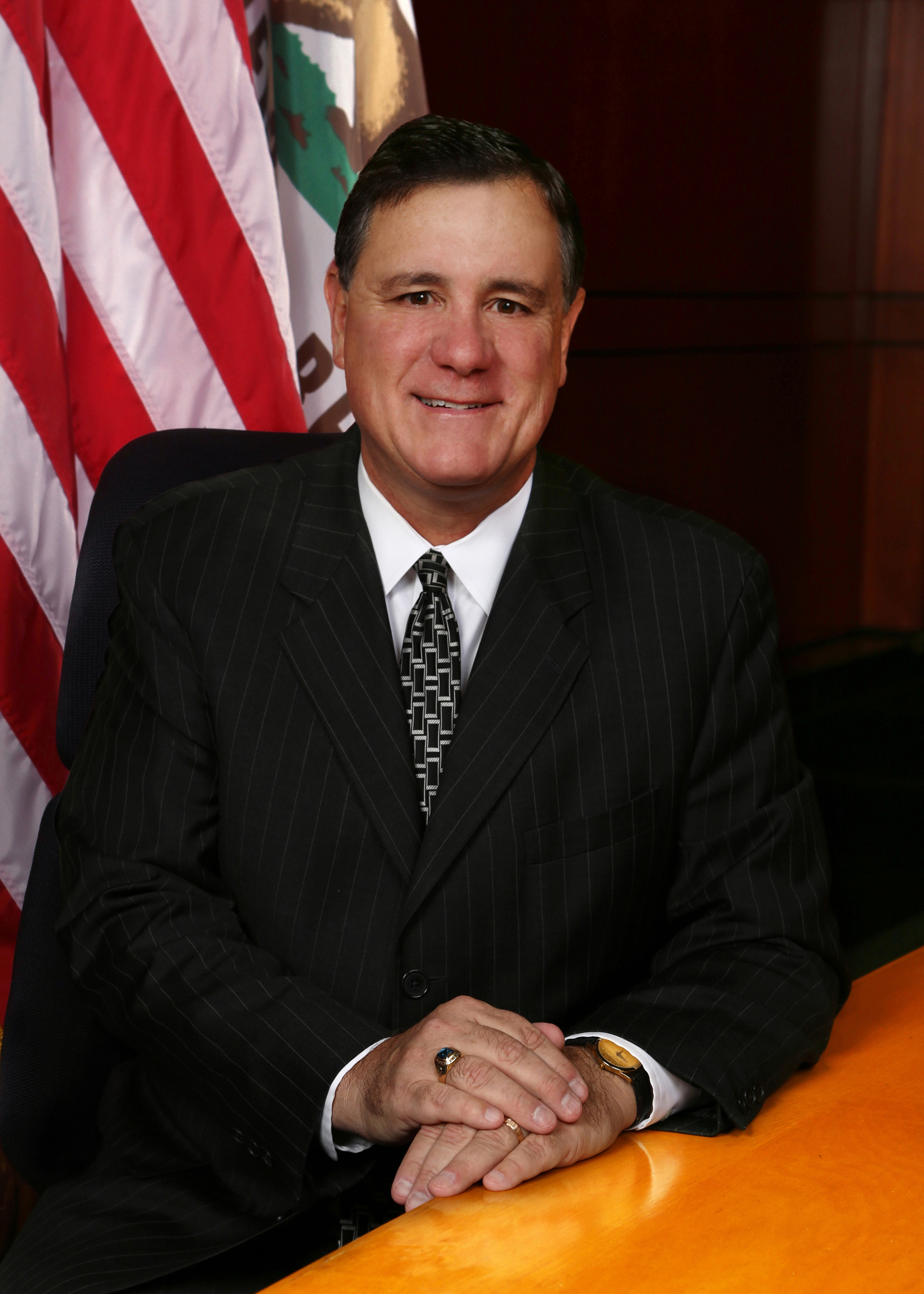

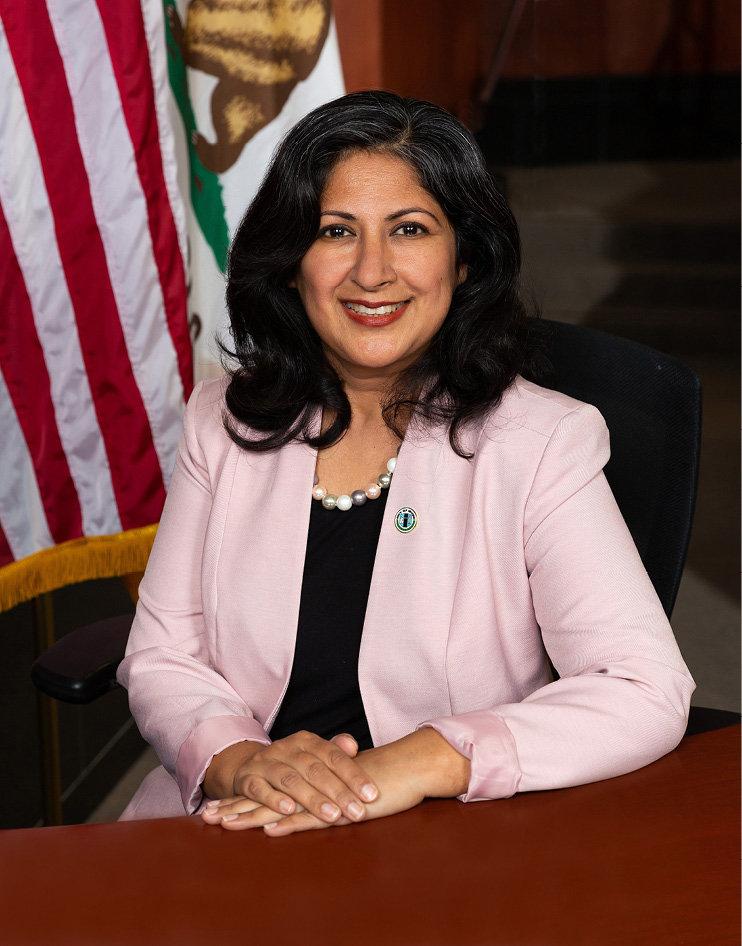
Candidate	Donald Wagner	Farrah Khan
First round	97,706; 63.48%	56,207; 36.52%
Supervisor before election
Donald Wagner
Elected Supervisor
Donald Wagner

The 3rd district includes Irvine and portions of Orange and Anaheim. Incumbent Republican Donald Wagner ran for re-election.

=== Candidates ===
- Farrah Khan (Democratic), mayor of Irvine
- Donald Wagner (Republican), incumbent supervisor

=== Endorsements ===
Donald Wagner (R)

Newspapers

- Orange County Register

=== General election ===
Incumbent Donald Wagner won a majority of the vote on March 5, winning re-election in the first round and avoiding a runoff.

General election results
Candidate	Votes	%
Donald P. Wagner	97,706	63.48
Farrah Khan	56,207	36.52
Total votes	153,913	100%
