= 2024 Chilean regional elections =

2nd regional gubernatorial elections in Chile

- 27 October 2024 (first round); 24 November 2024 (second round)

The 2024 Chilean regional elections were held on 26 and 27 October 2024, along with the municipal and councilor elections. This was the first time that the 16 regional governors, along with the 302 members of the 16 regional councils, will be elected simultaneously. Regional governors serve a four-year term and can only be re-elected once. If none of the candidates in a region obtains 40% of the valid votes, a second round will be held between the top two candidates on the fourth Sunday after the first round. In this case, the runoff took place on 24 November 2024.

The Law No. 21.524 reinstated mandatory voting in all elections and referendums held in the country, except for primaries.

== Results ==
The center-right Chile Vamos coalition won in six regions.
