= 2024 Dominican Republic municipal elections =

The 2024 Dominican Republic municipal elections were held on 18 February 2024. Mayors and local councillors across the country were elected.

== Conduct ==
Voting took place between the hours of 07:00-17:00 at polling stations across the country. Election day is officially recognized as a non-working day, as per the provisions outlined in Article 229 of the Law on the Electoral Regime.

The Electoral Observation Mission of the Organization of American States began activities in the country on 13 February 2024. The Mission observed the electoral organization, electoral technology, electoral justice, political-electoral financing, and political participation of women in the municipal elections. The Mission will present a report with insights and recommendations for future elections in the Dominican Republic. The OAS Mission in the country is headed by former Foreign Minister of Paraguay, Eladio Loizaga.

== Results ==
According to the first bulletins from the Central Electoral Board, the Modern Revolutionary Party would have achieved victory in 122 municipalities in the country, obtaining close to 70% of the national total. The Modern Revolutionary Party secured key victories in densely populated regions including the National District, Santo Domingo Este, Santo Domingo Norte, Los Alcarrizo, Santiago, La Vega, San Francisco de Macorís and San Cristóbal.

The People's Force denounced an abusive use of state resources in favor of the ruling party and the initiation of legal actions before the Central Electoral Board.
