= 2024 Jamaican local elections =

Local election in Jamaica

- 26 February 2024

228 Jamaican electoral divisions 13 Municipal corporations
	First party	Second party
Party	PNP	JLP
Last election	46.38%, 97 seats 3 councils	51.76%, 131 seats 9 councils
Seats won	115; 6 councils	113; 7 councils
Seat change	▲18 ▲3 councils	▼18 ▼2 councils
Popular vote	326,450	301,043
Percentage	51.83%	47.80%
Swing	▲5.45pp	▼3.96pp
- Results by municipal corporation

Local elections were held in Jamaica on 26 February 2024. Nomination day was on February 8, 2024. 228 divisions and the leadership of 13 municipal bodies will be elected.

== Background ==
The elections were delayed by 12 months in February 2023. The election was overseen by the Electoral Commission of Jamaica.

In December 2023, a poll suggested that 38% of Jamaicans intended to participate.

== Results ==
The Jamaica Labour Party (JLP) which won 7 of the 13 municipal corporations won the elections despite losing the popular vote. The Citizens Action for Free and Fair Elections (CAFFE) reported that the local elections proceeded with no major incident. There were 365 polling stations.

=== Municipal corporations ===
Party	Votes	%	Seats			
Party	Votes	%	Seats	+/–	Councils	+/–
People's National Party	326,450	51.82	115	+19	6	+2
Jamaica Labour Party	301,043	47.79	113	–18	7	–2
United Independents' Congress of Jamaica	86	0.01	0	0	0	0
Independents	2,332	0.37	0	0	0	0
Total	629,911	100.00	228	0	13	0
Source: Electoral Office

==== By parish ====
Parish council	JLP	PNP	Mayorship	Deputy Mayorship
Kingston and St. Andrew Corporation	20	20	PNP	JLP
St. Catherine	20	21	PNP	PNP
St. Thomas	6	4	JLP	JLP
Portland	7	2	JLP	JLP
St. Mary	6	7	PNP	PNP
St. Ann	11	5	JLP	JLP
Trelawny	6	3	JLP	JLP
St. James	11	6	JLP	JLP
Hanover	0	7	PNP	PNP
Clarendon	12	10	JLP	JLP
Manchester	3	12	PNP	PNP
St. Elizabeth	9	6	JLP	JLP
Westmoreland	3	11	PNP	PNP
Total	113	115	JLP: 7 PNP: 6	JLP: 8 PNP: 5
Source: Electoral Office of Jamaica
