= Elections in Liberia =

Elections in Liberia occur solely at the national level. The head of state, the President of Liberia, is elected to a six-year term in a two-round system, in which a run-off between the two candidates with the highest number of votes is held should no single candidate earn a majority of the vote in the first round. The Legislature has two elected chambers.

The House of Representatives has 73 members, elected to six-year terms by the first-past-the-post method in single-member districts. The Senate has 30 members, 2 from each county, elected at-large to nine-year terms by the first-past-the-post method. Senatorial elections are staggered, with one senator from each county being elected in elections held three years apart, followed by a six-year period in which no senatorial elections are held.

All citizens who are 18 years or older may register to vote in elections. Under Article 83(a) of the Constitution, elections are held on the second Tuesday of October every election year, with presidential run-off elections being held on the second Tuesday following the announcement of the results of the first round. Elections are regulated by the National Elections Commission of Liberia (NEC).

The first round of a general election to elect the President and House of Representatives on 10 October 2017, resulted in a run-off between ex-football star George Weah and Vice President Joseph Boakai. George Weah won the run-off with more than 60% of the ballots cast.

== Latest elections ==
=== Presidential elections ===
No candidate won a majority in the first round, with Weah narrowly placing first over opposition leader Joseph Boakai, which meant both advanced to a runoff held on 14 November 2023.

Boakai defeated Weah 51% to 49% in the closest runoff in Liberia's electoral history.

Candidate	Running mate	Party	First round		Second round	
Candidate	Running mate	Party	Votes	%	Votes	%
George Weah	Jewel Taylor	Coalition for Democratic Change	804,087	43.83	793,914	49.36
Joseph Boakai	Jeremiah Koung	Unity Party	796,961	43.44	814,481	50.64
Edward W. Appleton	Alex Gontee	Grassroots Development Movement	40,271	2.20		
Lusinee Kamara	Matthew Darblo	All Liberia Coalition Party	35,988	1.96		
Alexander B. Cummings Jr.	Charlyne Brumskine	Collaborating Political Parties	29,613	1.61		
Tiawan Saye Gongloe	Emmanuel Yarkpawolo	Liberian People's Party	26,394	1.44		
Allen R. Brown Jr.	Noosevett Weah	Liberia Restoration Party	15,607	0.85		
Simeon Freeman	James Barclay	Movement for Progressive Change	13,205	0.72		
William Wiah Tuider	Jonah Dumoe	Democratic National Allegiance	11,184	0.61		
Joshua Tom Turner	Somah Paygai	New Liberia Party	9,813	0.53		
Jeremiah Whapoe	Erasmus Fahnbulleh	Vision for Liberia Transformation	9,149	0.50		
Luther Yorfee	Juvenal Pearson	Liberia Rebuilding Party	6,479	0.35		
Bendu Kromah	Thomas Kruah	Independent	5,991	0.33		
Clarence Moniba	Grace-Tee Kpaan	Liberia National Union	5,298	0.29		
Sherikh Kouyateh	Max Vargbelee	Liberia First Movement	5,100	0.28		
David Kiamu	Annie Tuazama	Democratic People's Party of Liberia	5,086	0.28		
Alexander Kollie	Grace Yuan	Reformers National Congress	4,398	0.24		
Sara Beysolow Nyanti	Simeon Moribah	African Liberation League	3,644	0.20		
Robert Franz Morris	Celia Brown	Independent	3,363	0.18		
Richard Saye Miller	Emike Slawon	Liberian for Prosperity Party	2,885	0.16		
Total			1,834,516	100.00	1,608,395	100.00
Valid votes			1,834,516	94.12	1,608,395	98.42
Invalid/blank votes			114,639	5.88	25,788	1.58
Total votes			1,949,155	100.00	1,634,183	100.00
Registered voters/turnout			2,471,617	78.86	2,471,617	66.12
Source: NEC (candidates), NEC

=== House of Representatives elections ===
Party	Votes	%	Seats	+/–
Coalition for Democratic Change	401,921	22.12	25	+4
Unity Party	237,931	13.09	11	−9
Collaborating Political Parties (ANC–LP)	137,909	7.59	6	New
People's Unification Party	78,913	4.34	2	−3
Movement for Democracy and Reconstruction	50,408	2.77	4	+2
All Liberian Party	45,886	2.53	1	−2
Liberia National Union	42,179	2.32	1	0
Movement for One Liberia	38,884	2.14	0	New
Liberian People's Party	35,400	1.95	0	−1
National Development Party	32,202	1.77	0	New
Economic Freedom Fighters of Liberia	26,102	1.44	0	New
All Liberia Coalition Party	23,436	1.29	0	New
African Liberation League	20,562	1.13	0	New
Liberia Transformation Party	19,087	1.05	0	−1
Democratic National Allegiance	18,959	1.04	0	New
Movement for Progressive Change	18,946	1.04	1	+1
National Democratic Coalition	18,768	1.03	1	New
Vision for Liberia Transformation	14,641	0.81	1	+1
United Independent Democrats	14,393	0.79	0	New
Liberia Restoration Party	13,604	0.75	1	+1
New Liberia Party	10,057	0.55	0	0
Democratic People's Party of Liberia	9,850	0.54	0	New
Liberia Rebuilding Party	9,768	0.54	0	New
Liberia First Movement	8,608	0.47	0	New
Rainbow Alliance (TWP−VCP)	8,574	0.47	0	New
Liberian for Prosperity Party	4,499	0.25	0	New
Reformers National Congress	3,116	0.17	0	New
African Democratic Movement of Liberia	2,303	0.13	0	New
All Liberians Solidarity Party	1,940	0.11	0	New
Greater Action Party of Liberia	831	0.05	0	New
Grassroots Development Movement	228	0.01	0	New
Independents	467,105	25.71	19	+6
Total	1,817,010	100.00	73	0
Valid votes	1,817,010	94.10		
Invalid/blank votes	113,962	5.90		
Total votes	1,930,972	100.00		
Registered voters/turnout	2,471,617	78.13		
Source: NEC

=== Senate elections ===
Party	Votes	%	Seats				
Party	Votes	%	Total before	Up	Won	Total after	+/–
Coalition for Democratic Change	620,892	34.26	6 (Note: 5 held by the Congress for Democratic Change, 1 by the National Patriotic Party.)	3 (Note: 2 held by the Congress for Democratic Change, 1 by the National Patriotic Party.)	6	9	+3
Unity Party	218,138	12.04	6	4	1	3	–3
Movement for Democracy and Reconstruction	128,437	7.09	1	0	1	2	+1
People's Unification Party	86,466	4.77	2	1	0	1	–1
Collaborating Political Parties (ANC–LP)	83,423	4.60	6 (Note: 4 held by the Liberty Party, 2 by the Alternative National Congress.)	3 (Note: 2 held by the Liberty Party, 1 by the Alternative National Congress.)	0	3	–3
Liberia National Union	41,681	2.30	0	0	0	0	0
Liberian People's Party	39,718	2.19	0	0	0	0	0
United Independent Democrats	30,149	1.66	0	0	0	0	New
All Liberia Coalition Party	29,362	1.62	0	0	0	0	0
Liberia Restoration Party	26,575	1.47	0	0	1	1	+1
All Liberian Party	14,121	0.78	1	0	0	1	0
National Development Party	7,077	0.39	0	0	0	0	New
Economic Freedom Fighters of Liberia	6,590	0.36	0	0	0	0	New
Rainbow Alliance (TWP−VCP)	6,552	0.36	0	0	0	0	0
Movement for One Liberia	5,823	0.32	0	0	0	0	0
Democratic National Allegiance	5,206	0.29	0	0	0	0	New
All Liberians Solidarity Party	3,764	0.21	0	0	0	0	New
Vision for Liberia Transformation	3,609	0.20	0	0	0	0	0
New Liberia Party	3,425	0.19	0	0	0	0	0
Liberia Transformation Party	2,881	0.16	0	0	0	0	0
National Democratic Coalition	2,443	0.13	1	1	0	0	–1
Greater Action Party of Liberia	2,120	0.12	0	0	0	0	New
Movement for Progressive Change	2,046	0.11	0	0	0	0	0
Liberia Rebuilding Party	664	0.04	0	0	0	0	New
Independents	441,001	24.34	7	3	6	10	+3
Total	1,812,163	100.00	30	15	15	30	0
Valid votes	1,812,163	93.37					
Invalid/blank votes	128,694	6.63					
Total votes	1,940,857	100.00					
Registered voters/turnout	2,471,617	78.53					
Source: NEC

== See also ==
- National Election Commission (Liberia)
- Politics of Liberia
