= 2019 Liberian by-elections =

The 2019 Liberian by-elections were held on July 29 and October 5 in Montserrado County and Grand Cape Mount County respectively. The by-elections in Montserrado were to fill two vacancies, one in the House of Representatives and one in the Senate. The Grand Cape Mount by-election filled one vacancy in the Senate. The Montserrado House by-election in the county's fifteenth district held a partial rerun of the election on August 28. In the end, opposition candidate Abraham Darius Dillon was elected to the Senate in Montserrado County, and ruling party candidate Abu Kamara was elected in the House. Victor Varney Watson was elected to the Senate in Grand Cape Mount County.

== Background ==
=== Montserrado County ===
Montserrado Senator Geraldine Doe-Sheriff died in February 2019. Montserrado-15 Representative Adolph Lawrence died in a car crash in March 2019. The National Elections Commission (NEC) was notified of the vacancies in the legislature in April. By early May, the NEC had announced that the two by-elections would be held jointly and set July 2 as the election date.

The two major parties in both elections were the ruling Coalition for Democratic Change (CDC) and the opposition Collaborating Political Parties (CPP). The CPP was a recently formed political alliance between the former ruling Unity Party (UP), the Alternative National Congress (ANC), the All Liberian Party (ALP), and the Liberty Party (LP). Montserrado County was considered a stronghold for the CDC. The CDC, or its founding constituent party the Congress for Democratic Change, had won every Montserrado County senate seat since the 2005 election.

The Montserrado County by-election candidate nominations occurred from May 6 to 18, with seven candidates in each race. There were no candidates disqualified. In the sentorial race, the CPP backed the LP's Abraham Darius Dillon and the CDC backed Paulita C. C. Wie. Dillon had previously ran for the senate in the 2009 by-election. He gained prominence as the spokesman for the Council of Patriots, an opposition group formed in the wake of mass protests on June 7. He also severed as chairman for political affairs for the LP. Wie had served as deputy minister for internal affairs. The other candidates were Mohammed Ayoub Dukuly with the Vision for Liberia Transformation (VOLT), and independent candidates MacDella Cooper, Samuel Reagen Enders, Massa Massaquoi Kanyon, and Kimmie L. Weeks.

In the 15th House district, the two major candidates were Abu Bana Kamara, backed by the CDC, and the ALP's Telia J. Urey, backed by the CPP. Kamara had run for local offices in the district and had a longer history in the area. He had served as assistant minister of transportation under President Ellen Johnson Sirleaf. Urey was the daughter of ALP founder and CPP chairman Benoni Urey. She was a philanthropist and businesswoman. The other candidates were Erasmus Daoda Fahnbulleh Sr. of VOLT, Lamenu Capy Kamara of the True Whig Party, Amos Nyanwleh Tubor Jr. of the Coalition for Liberia's Progress (CLP), as well as the independent candidates Kelvin Morris Bayoh and Bishop Slebo Frank. Bayoh's candidacy was supported by the family of the deceased Representative Lawrence.

On June 4, NEC Chairman Jerome Korkoya warned that if necessary election materials did not arrive by June 30, the by-election scheduled for July 2 could be delayed. The NEC also had problems negotiating for funds to conduct the election from the Ministry of Finance. The NEC's budget did not contain a contingency for by-elections. Representative Dixon Wlawee Seiboe, after the death of Grand Cape Mount County Senator Edward B. Dagoseh triggered the need for another by-election, suggested that President George Weah declare a state of emergency to allow the by-election to take place on alongside the 2020 midterm elections, despite constitutional concerns.

The by-election had to be delayed from July 2 to July 8 due to a lack of polling kits and funds. By July 4, the election had again been postponed, this time indefinitely. On July 12, Chairman Korkoya explained the election date was contingent on the arrival of the election materials. The delays triggered suspicion among the opposition, with CPP candidate Dillon accusing the CDC of colluding with the NEC to buy time and build support before the election. The polling kits had arrived on July 18. The following day, the NEC had announced the elections would take place on July 29, with the campaigns finishing on July 27.

The Montserrado by-election campaign had been largely peaceful, outside of two incidents against the Urey campaign. On June 8, a Urey supporter was attacked in the Blamo Town community while erecting campaign materials, allegedly by Kamara supporters. Earlier, two members of Urey's campaign team were attacked, again allegedly by Kamara supporters.

=== Grand Cape Mount County ===
Grand Cape Mount Senator Edward B. Dagoseh of the UP died in June 2019. The NEC was notified of the senate vacancy in July.

Candidate nomination took place between August 13 and August 21. On August 23, the ruling CDC had announced that it would not be putting forth a candidate for the Grand Cape Mount by-election. Instead, Chairman Mulbah K. Morlu stated the party would be forming a committee to investigate its defeat in the Monsterrado County senatorial by-election. Grand Cape Mount County was not seen as a strong one for the CDC, instead being more of a stronghold for the UP.

There were seven candidates for the senate seat. The candidate backed by the CPP was the UP's Dabah M. Varpilah, however, the ANC, another constituent party of the CPP, had also nominated a candidate, Simeon Bioma Taylor. Conflict between the two parties emerged, with the ANC accusing the UP of attempting to dominate the CPP coalition, however, the ANC ultimately backed down and attempted to withdraw Taylor as a candidate, and began to support Varpilah's candidacy. The NEC ruled that it was a violation of election law for Taylor to withdraw his candidacy and that his name would appear on the ballot. The ANC announced that it would be seeking legal action against the NEC. It also wanted to pursue legal action against Taylor, as he continued to campaign for the seat, despite the decision of his party.

The other candidates were Cuttington University lecturer Victor Varney Watson of the People's Unification Party, which allied with the ruling CDC, Sando Wayne of the United People's Party, Matthew V. Z. Darblo Sr. of VOLT, Kula Bona Nyei Fofana of the CLP, and independent candidate Daoda Vatorma Metzger.

By September, the election date was scheduled for October 5, with the campaign ending on October 3. NEC Chairman Korkoya confirmed there would be no postponement like in the recent Montserrado County by-election.

== Aftermath ==
=== Montserrado County ===
The by-election was held on July 29. Voter turnout was low. The vote tallying process was commenced by the NEC on July 30. Preliminary results released by July 30 showed Dillon ahead of Wie by a large margin. They also showed in the House election that Urey was in the lead over Kamara. The opposition had celebrated these early results before victory had been announced. Kimmie Weeks had congratulated Dillon on his victory. In a press conference on July 30, CDC Chairman Mulbah K. Morlu stated that the CDC was in the lead in both races, contrary to the preliminary results. The NEC also announced that day there would be a postponement of one day before the beginning of the official vote tallying process.

On August 2, the NEC had announced the final results for the senatorial by-election. Dillon had won with 102,549 votes compared to Wie's 63,971 votes. The CDC had conceded the race before the final results were announced. Senator-elect Dillon was certificated by the NEC on August 9.

The NEC did not release the full results for the House election on August 2. It only displayed the provisional results for 74 of the 94 polling places in the 15th district. It showed Urey slightly ahead of Kamara with 5,573 votes versus 5,417. The Urey campaign had submitted a complaint to NEC. It alleged irregularities committed by several NEC officers in observed polling places. Telia Urey requested a rerun of the election in the entire district. In a ruling by the NEC hearing officers and board of commissioners, it was found that Urey's claims were unproven, however, twenty polling places in six polling precincts did show irregularities and had potentially been tampered with. As a result, it ruled the NEC should commission a rerun in the quarantined polling places. Initially, Kamara and the CDC were against such a rerun, threatening a boycott. The CDC had alleged that there had been five complaints submitted by other candidates to the NEC, but only Urey's was considered. Kamara filed an appeal of the decision with the board of commissioners, but the initial decision was upheld. Kamara filed another appeal to the Supreme Court, however, he later withdrew his appeal and accepted the rerun. The NEC then set the date for the rerun to be August 28.

There was an incident of political violence on August 17. Urey and some of her supporters had been held hostage for over an hour by CDC supporters. The CDC supporters had thrown stones, damaging Urey's vehicle and some of her property had been stolen. Four people were later charged with theft and criminal mischief in relation to the event.

The rerun was held on August 28. It saw high voter turnout. Senator Nyonblee Karnga-Lawrence, the widow of the late Representative Lawrence, had supported Urey during the rerun campaign. The results of the election were posted by the NEC on August 28. Urey conceded hours later. Kamara received 8,678 votes in total compared to Urey's 6,868. The final results were announced August 29. Kamara was sworn into office on September 3.

=== Grand Cape Mount County ===
The Grand Cape Mount by-election was a mostly peaceful affair, with no complaints of campaign violence being submitted to the NEC.

The election had a low voter turnout. The Liberia Elections Observation Network (LEON) reported that a shortage of election staff at roughly a third of observed polling places. It further reported that four observed polling places did not adequately explain to voters how to vote correctly. The by-election was further marred by incidents involving a failure to replace lost or damaged voter registration cards, which impaired some citizens' ability to vote. The NEC had scheduled a required activity to replace voter cards between August 26 and August 31, however the activity did not happen.

Watson was declared the winner of the election on October 8. He received 6,920 votes compared to the candidate in second place, Taylor at 4,932. Watson's certification by the NEC was delayed by complaints filed by Varpilah and Taylor. Taylor withdrew his complaint. Watson was certificated on November 18.

== Results ==
The following are the results for the 2019 by-elections from the NEC.

2019 Montserrado County Senatorial By-election
Candidate	Party	Votes	%
Abraham Darius Dillon	Liberty Party	102,549	55.74
Paulita C. C. Wie	Coalition for Democratic Change	63,971	34.77
Mohammed Ayoub Dukuly	Vision for Liberia Transformation	4,700	2.55
Kimmie L. Weeks	Independent	4,628	2.52
MacDella Mackie Cooper	Independent	4,540	2.47
Samuel Reagen Enders	Independent	2,699	1.47
Massa Massaquoi Kanyon	Independent	883	0.48
Total		183,970	100.00
Valid votes		183,970	98.39
Invalid/blank votes		3,008	1.61
Total votes		186,978	100.00
LP gain from UP			

2019 Grand Cape Mount County Senatorial By-election
Candidate	Party	Votes	%
Victor Varney Watson	People's Unification Party	6,920	27.73
Simeon Boima Taylor	Alternative National Congress	4,932	19.76
Sando Wayne	United People's Party	3,954	15.84
Dabah Mabande Varpilah	Unity Party	3,291	13.19
Daoda Vatorma Metzger	Independent	2,605	10.44
Matthew V. Z. Darblo Sr.	Vision for Liberia Transformation	2,148	8.61
Kula Bona Nyei Fofana	Coalition for Liberia's Progress	1,106	4.43
Total		24,956	100.00
Valid votes		24,956	96.88
Invalid/blank votes		803	3.12
Total votes		25,759	100.00
PUP gain from CDC			
