= Grand Kru-1 =

Electoral district in Liberia

- Constituency for the House of Representatives of Liberia
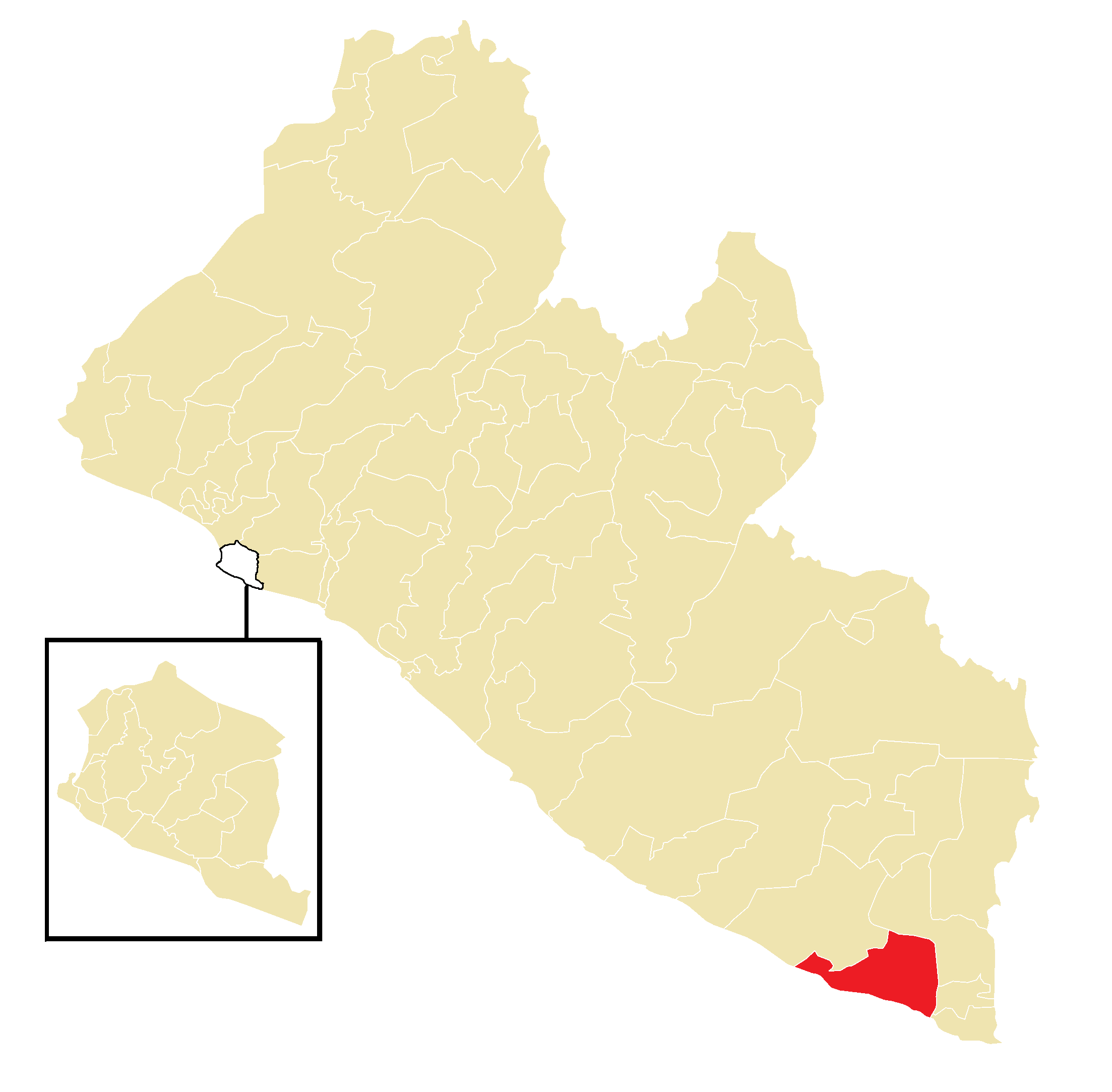
- Electorate: 20,439 (2023)

Current constituency
- Created: 2011
- Representative: Nathaniel N. Bahway, Sr.

Grand Kru-1 is an electoral district for the elections to the House of Representatives of Liberia. The constituency covers Bleebo District, the Trehn District, the Garraway District, the Grand Cess Wedabo District and the Kpor community of the Barclayville-Picnicess District.

== Elected representatives ==
Year	Representative elected	Party	Notes
2005	Gbenimah Balu Slopadoe	APD	
2011	George W. Blamoh	UP	
2017	Nathaniel N. Bahway, Sr.	LINU	
2023	Nathaniel N. Bahway, Sr.	CPP	

== Election results ==
2005 Grand Kru County's 1st House District Election
Candidate	Party	Votes	%
Gbenimah Balu Slopadoe	Alliance for Peace and Democracy	1,250	22.78
Isaiah Moboe Sarkor	Unity Party	1,203	21.92
William Buwolo Toe	National Patriotic Party	976	17.79
Stephen Gbeh Kofa Sr.	Congress for Democratic Change	808	14.73
Abraham Kipi Kipi	Coalition for the Transformation of Liberia	611	11.14
Proftehneseo P. Brohdonyen Sr.	National Democratic Party of Liberia	551	10.04
Vincent B. Boye	Liberty Party	88	1.60
Total		5,487	100.00
Valid votes		5,487	97.84
Invalid/blank votes		121	2.16
Total votes		5,608	100.00

2011 Grand Kru County's 1st House District Election
Candidate	Party	Votes	%
George W. Blamoh	Unity Party	3,852	41.18
Alexander Blotey Scere	Congress for Democratic Change	1,930	20.63
Roosevelt N. Nyema	National Union for Democratic Progress	914	9.77
Ralph N. Harris	Liberia Restoration Party	869	9.29
Dickson Gideon Nyemah Sr.	National Democratic Coalition	808	8.64
Isaac G. Nyema Sr.	Grassroot Democratic Party of Liberia	474	5.07
John Tarwoe Kobbah	Liberty Party	418	4.47
Bortue Nyeneh Sneh Sr.	Liberia Transformation Party	90	0.96
Total		9,355	100.00
Valid votes		9,355	92.72
Invalid/blank votes		734	7.28
Total votes		10,089	100.00

2017 Grand Kru County's 1st House District Election
Candidate	Party	Votes	%
Nathaniel N. Bahway Sr.	Liberia National Union	1,529	14.23
Kumeh Salim Assaf	Liberty Party	1,431	13.32
Patrick Nyepan Kpanyen	Grassroot Democratic Party of Liberia	1,066	9.92
Joseph K. Bioh	Alternative National Congress	1,020	9.49
Doris N. Ylatun	Coalition for Democratic Change	906	8.43
Brown Blanyon Sarlee Sr.	Independent	783	7.29
Blanyon B. Himmie	Coalition for Liberia's Progress	741	6.90
Dickson G. Nyemah Sr.	Liberia Transformation Party	711	6.62
Alfred D. Gadeh	Victory for Change Party	581	5.41
Kay Sieh Smith	People's Unification Party	555	5.17
John Noin Chea	Movement for Democracy and Reconstruction	498	4.63
Victor E. Dweh Kaydor Sr.	Unity Party	378	3.52
Chris Aloysius Teah	United People's Party	335	3.12
Sheakron Weh Bopleh	All Liberian Party	150	1.40
Sampson Klooh Wilson	Movement for Economic Empowerment	38	0.35
Vasco T. Masseh	Liberia Restoration Party	23	0.21
Total		10,745	100.00
Valid votes		10,745	91.63
Invalid/blank votes		981	8.37
Total votes		11,726	100.00
