= Miatta =

Miatta is a feminine given name. Notable people with the name include:

- Miatta Fahnbulleh (born 1979), British politician
- Miatta Fahnbulleh (singer), Liberian singer and social activist
- Miatta Maria Samba, Sierra Leonean judge at the International Criminal Court
