= 2017 Liberian general election =

- Presidential election
- 10 October 2017 (first round); 26 December 2017 (second round)
- Turnout: 75.19% (first round); 55.78% (second round)
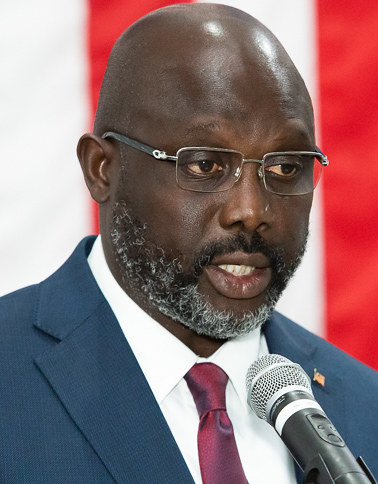

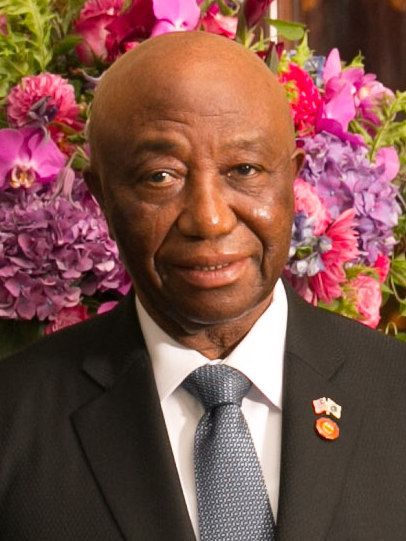
Nominee	George Weah	Joseph Boakai
Party	CDC	UP
Alliance	CDC	—
Running mate	Jewel Taylor	Emmanuel Nuquay
Popular vote	732,185	457,579
Percentage	61.54%	38.46%
President before election
Ellen Johnson Sirleaf
UP
Elected President
George Weah
CDC
- House of Representatives election
- All 73 seats in the House of Representatives; 37 seats needed for a majority
Party	Leader	Vote %	Seats	+/–
CDC	George Weah	15.57	21	+7
UP	Joseph Boakai	14.32	20	−4
LP	Charles Brumskine	8.57	3	−4
PUP	None	5.87	5	New
ALP	Benoni Urey	5.00	3	New
MDR	Prince Johnson	3.69	2	New
MOVEE	Joseph Jones	3.85	1	New
LTP	Kennedy Sandy	3.22	1	0
UPP	MacDonald A. Wento	3.08	1	New
VCP	None	1.84	1	+1
LPP	Henry Fahnbulleh Jr.	1.58	1	New
LINU	Clarence Moniba	1.31	1	+1
Independents	—	15.59	13	−2
This lists parties that won seats. See the complete results below.
Results by constituency

General elections were held in Liberia on 10 October 2017 to elect the President and House of Representatives. No candidate won a majority in the first round of the presidential vote, so the top two finishers – CDC standard-bearer Amb. George Weah and UP standard-bearer Vice President Joseph Boakai – competed in a run-off on 26 December. The second round was originally scheduled for 7 November, but was postponed after LP standard-bearer Cllr. Charles Brumskine, in third place, challenged the result in the Supreme Court. The Supreme Court dismissed the challenge, which would have forced a re-run of the first round had it been successful, and the second round was held on 26 December. Weah emerged victorious with 60% of the vote.

The elections were overseen by the National Elections Commission (NEC) and were the first elections to be run entirely by the Government of Liberia and security forces since the conclusion of the civil wars in 2003.

== Electoral system ==
The president is elected using the two-round system, whilst the 73 members of the House of Representatives are elected by first-past-the-post voting in single-member constituencies.

== Candidates ==
Incumbent President Ellen Johnson Sirleaf, in office since 2006, was constitutionally barred from running for a third term; the election was therefore to choose her successor.

- Joseph Boakai, Vice President since January 2006
- Charles Brumskine, Leader of the Liberty Party and former President Pro Temp of the Senate
- MacDella Cooper, philanthropist
- Alexander B. Cummings, former executive vice president and chief administrative officer of Coca-Cola
- Prince Yormie Johnson, former rebel leader
- Joseph Mills Jones, leader of the Movement for Economic Empowerment and former Governor of the Central Bank of Liberia
- Richard Miller, businessman
- Benoni Urey, businessman
- George Weah, former footballer who was defeated by Ellen Johnson Sirleaf in the 2005 election
- MacDonald A. Wento, United People's Party
- Jeremiah Whapoe, businessman

== Opinion polls ==
Pollster	Date	Sample size	Boakai Unity	Weah CDC	Johnson FDUP	Urey All Liberian	Brumskine Liberty	Cooper ULD	Cummings ANC	Undecided
Liberia Holding Consortium	May 2017	275	29.45%	21.18%	N/A	11.26%	16%	0.72%	9.45%	N/A
Liberia Holding Consortium	June 2017	484	36.36%	18.38%	3.92%	4.75%	13.22%	0.82%	7.02%	13.01%
Liberia Holding Consortium	August 2017	763	33.81%	21.1%	2.88%	2.49%	12.45%	N/A	5.63%	13.63%
International Political Polls	August 2017	1,224	21.74%	24.73%	8.72%	6.38%	23.49%	N/A	9.55%	N/A

== Conduct ==
The European Union Electoral Observer Mission (EU EOM)'s preliminary statement, issued on 12 October 2017, acknowledged generally peaceful polling. However, "The EU EOM has directly observed several instances of public officials engaged in campaigning that further hampered equality among contestants. The mission has received claims about the uneven use of state resources and access to public spaces working to the advantage of the incumbent. The mission's direct observation indicates a high level of monetization of the campaign, where a culture of in-kind and financial hand-outs to communities prevails."

== Results ==
=== President ===
Candidate	Running mate	Party	First round		Second round	
Candidate	Running mate	Party	Votes	%	Votes	%
George Weah	Jewel Taylor	Coalition for Democratic Change	596,037	38.37	732,185	61.54
Joseph Boakai	Emmanuel James Nuquay	Unity Party	446,716	28.76	457,579	38.46
Charles Brumskine	Harrison S. Karnwea Sr.	Liberty Party	149,495	9.62		
Prince Johnson	Audrian R. Smith-Forbes	Movement for Democracy and Reconstruction	127,666	8.22		
Alexander B. Cummings Jr.	Jeremiah Sulunteh	Alternative National Congress	112,067	7.21		
Benoni Urey	Alexander Nyonkon Duopu	All Liberian Party	24,246	1.56		
Joseph Mills Jones	Samuel B. Reeves Jr.	Movement for Economic Empowerment	12,854	0.83		
MacDella Cooper	William R. Slocum	Liberia Restoration Party	11,645	0.75		
Henry Boimah Fahnbulleh	Marcus S.G. Dahn	Liberian People's Party	11,560	0.74		
Oscar Cooper	Wonderr Koryenen Freeman	Independent	10,381	0.67		
MacDonald A. Wento	John N. Bleah	United People's Party	8,968	0.58		
Simeon C. M. Freeman	William T. Knowlden	Movement for Progressive Change	6,682	0.43		
Isaac Gbombadee Wiles	Richmond D. K. Yarkpah	Democratic Justice Party	6,379	0.41		
Aloysius William Kpadeh	John S. Partor	Independent	5,922	0.38		
Kennedy Gbleyah Sandy	Victoria Morris Tweh	Liberia Transformation Party	5,343	0.34		
George Sluwer Dweh Sr.	Annie Y. Tuazama	Redemption Democratic Congress	4,935	0.32		
William Wiah Tuider	Dave L. Dixon	New Liberia Party	4,920	0.32		
Jeremiah Z. Whapoe	Isaac D. G. Flowers	Vision for Liberia Transformation	3,946	0.25		
Yarkpajuwur N. Mator	Ruth L. Kollie	Independent	1,940	0.12		
Wendell J. E. McIntosh	Manjerngie Cecelia Ndebe	Change Democratic Action	1,646	0.11		
Total			1,553,348	100.00	1,189,764	100.00
Valid votes			1,553,348	94.61	1,189,764	97.67
Invalid/blank votes			88,574	5.39	28,360	2.33
Total votes			1,641,922	100.00	1,218,124	100.00
Registered voters/turnout			2,183,629	75.19	2,183,629	55.78

=== House of Representatives ===
Party	Votes	%	Seats	+/–
Coalition for Democratic Change (CDC–NPP–LPDP)	239,754	15.57	21	+7
Unity Party	220,508	14.32	20	−4
Liberty Party	131,980	8.57	3	−4
Alternative National Congress	93,475	6.07	0	New
People's Unification Party	90,421	5.87	5	New
All Liberian Party	77,013	5.00	3	New
Movement for Economic Empowerment	59,268	3.85	1	New
Movement for Democracy and Reconstruction	56,734	3.69	2	New
Coalition for Liberia's Progress	50,732	3.30	0	New
Liberia Transformation Party	49,621	3.22	1	0
United People's Party	47,357	3.08	1	New
Victory for Change Party	28,385	1.84	1	+1
Liberian People's Party	24,287	1.58	1	New
Vision for Liberia Transformation	21,324	1.39	0	New
Grassroot Democratic Party of Liberia	20,588	1.34	0	0
Liberia National Union	20,227	1.31	1	+1
Movement for Progressive Change	19,980	1.30	0	−2
True Whig Party	14,723	0.96	0	New
Liberia Restoration Party	11,690	0.76	0	New
Democratic Justice Party	7,415	0.48	0	New
Change Democratic Action	7,166	0.47	0	New
Redemption Democratic Congress	5,731	0.37	0	New
Liberians for Prosperity	628	0.04	0	New
New Liberia Party	494	0.03	0	New
Independents	240,001	15.59	13	−2
Total	1,539,502	100.00	73	0
Valid votes	1,539,502	94.86		
Invalid/blank votes	83,427	5.14		
Total votes	1,622,929	100.00		
Registered voters/turnout	2,183,629	74.32		
