= Montserrado-14 =

District for the election to the house of Representatives of Liberia

- Constituency for the House of Representatives of Liberia
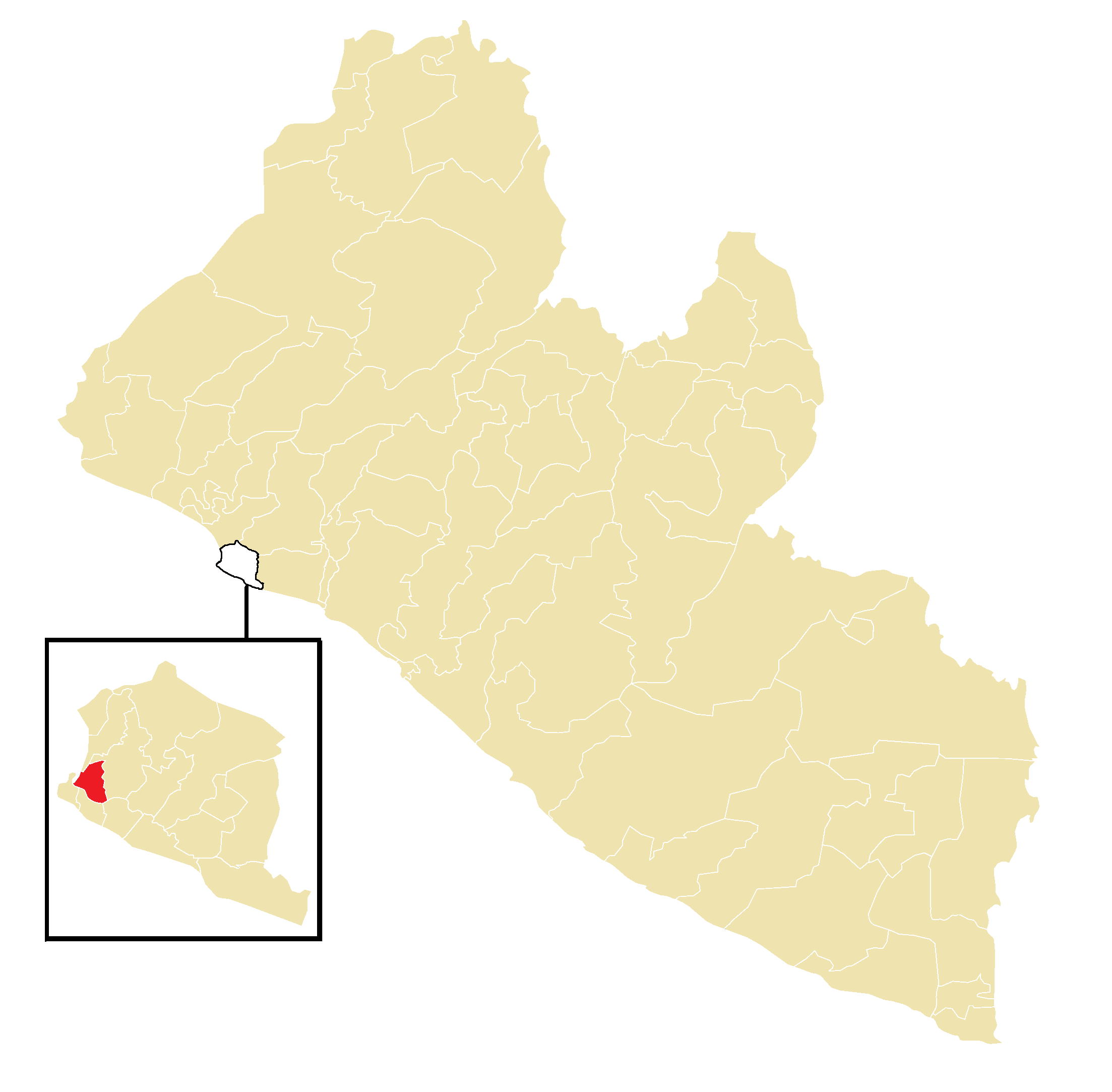
- Electorate: 39,859 (2023)

Current constituency
- Created: 2011
- Representative: Kerkula Muka Kamara

Montserrado-14 is an electoral district for the elections to the House of Representatives of Liberia. The district covers the southern half of Garwolon Township, i.e. the communities of Vai Town A, Vai Town B, Giblata, Central Clara Town I, Central Clara Town II, Paity Town, River View, Peugeot Garage, Hope Community, Struggle Community, Free Port Community and Cow Factory.

== Elected representatives ==
| Year | Representative elected | Party | Notes |
|---|---|---|---|
| 2005 | Richard I. A. Holder | IND | |
| 2011 | Abraham V. Corneh, III | IND | |
| 2017 | Abraham V. Corneh, III | CDC | |
| 2023 | Kerkula Muka Kamara | CDC | |
