= Mary Brownell =

Liberian peace activist (1929–2017)

- Born: Mary Nema Brownell; 12 March 1929; Cavalla, Maryland, Liberia
- Died: 14 March 2017 (aged 88); Monrovia, Liberia
- Other name: Ma Mary
- Education: University of Liberia; University of San Francisco
- Occupations: Peace activist and educator
- Organization(s): Liberia Women Initiative (LWI); Mano River Women’s Peace Network (Marwopnet); Servants of Africa Fighting Ebola (SAFE)
- Spouse: Henry Boimah Fahnbulleh Snr.
- Children: 5, including Miatta Fahnbulleh and Henry Boimah Fahnbulleh Jr.

Mary Nema Brownell (12 March 1929 – 14 March 2017), known as Ma Mary, was a Liberian peace activist and educator. She was founder of the Liberia Women Initiative (LWI) and mobilised women to engage in the peacebuilding process following the Liberian Civil Wars.

== Early life and education ==
Mary Nema Brownell was born on 12 March 1929 in Cavalla, Maryland, Liberia. She moved with her family to Monrovia aged 5 and attended the Suehn Baptist Mission's school in Bomi County from 1937.

Brownell studied an elementary education degree at the University of Liberia, graduating in 1960, then studied a masters degree in school supervision at the University of San Francisco in San Francisco, California, United States. After returning to Liberia, she worked as a schoolteacher.

== Activism ==
During the First Liberian Civil War (1989–1997), Brownell founded and became the head of the Liberia Women Initiative (LWI, a non-partisan organisation) in January 1994. The LWI was successor of the Liberian Federation of Women's Organizations, which had been banned in 1980. Through the LWI, Brownell mobilized Liberian women to engage in the peacebuilding process and politics. The LWI took a unified stance and campaigned for disarmament, free and transparent elections, education and the reunification of the country, which were implemented in 1997.

When conflict resumed in the Second Liberian Civil War (1999–2003), Browell continued to advocate for peace through the women's initiative Marwopnet (Mano River Women’s Peace Network). Brownell was said to have forced a meeting between the President of Liberia Charles Taylor and President of Guinea Lansannah Conte, who refused to engage with each other. She said during a meeting with Conte that: "you and President Taylor have to meet as men and iron out your differences, and we women want to be present. We will lock you in this room until you come to your senses, and I will sit on the key." After this was translated into French, Conte laughed and responded: "What man do you think would say that to me? Only a woman could do such a thing and get by with it." Subsequent negotiations led to the Comprehensive Peace Accord in Accra, Ghana (2003).

Brownell was a later member of the Federation of African Women's Peace Network, was president of the Women Development Association of Liberia (WODAL), and was commissioner of the Liberian National Elections Commission (NEC). She gave testimony at the Liberian Truth and Reconciliation Commission (TRC) in August 2008.

In 2005, Brownell was named as a Nobel Peace Prize 1000 PeaceWomen Across the Globe (PWAG). In 2006, she was named as Ambassador for Peace by the Interreligious and International Foundation for World Peace.

In 2012, Brownell called for Liberian women to begin grooming a woman candidate to replace President of Liberia Ellen Johnson-Sirleaf after her term in office ended in 2017.

In 2014, Brownell volunteered to combat Ebola with the Servants of Africa Fighting Ebola (SAFE).

== Personal life ==
Brownell had five children with her husband Henry Boimah Fahnbulleh Sr, including Miatta Fahnbulleh, singer and human rights activist, and Henry Boimah Fahnbulleh Jr, educator, politician and diplomat. Her grandchildren include British politician Miatta Fahnbulleh and broadcast journalist Gamal Fahnbulleh.

Brownell was a member of the Episcopal Church of Liberia.

== Death ==
Brownell died on 14 March 2017 in Monrovia, Liberia, aged 88.
