= Granada Reports =

British TV regional news programme (since 1956)

- Also known as: Good Morning Granada; Granada Tonight (1990–2001); Granada News (1968–2013)
- Genre: Regional news
- Presented by: Gamal Fahnbulleh; Katie Walderman
- Countries of origin: England, United Kingdom
- Original language: English

Production
- Executive producer: Lucy West (Head of News)
- Production locations: MediaCityUK, Salford Quays, Greater Manchester
- Camera setup: Multi-camera
- Running time: 30 minutes
- Production company: ITV Granada

Original release
- Network: ITV1 (ITV Granada)
- Release: 1956 – present

Related
- ITV News; ITV Weather; The Granada Debate

ITV News Granada Reports is a British television regional news service, produced by ITV Granada and serving the North West of England.

== Overview ==
Granada Reports previous title card

Granada Reports is produced and broadcast from studios in the Orange Tower at MediaCityUK in Salford Quays.

Before this, the news service was based at Granada's Quay Street studios in Manchester city centre. Reporters are also based at newsrooms in the Royal Liver Building in Liverpool, Lancaster and on the Isle of Man. News staff were also based at district offices in Blackburn and Chester, until they were closed in 2005.

Most of Cumbria is served by ITV News Lookaround that broadcasts from Gateshead but southern parts of the county, such as Barrow-in-Furness, are still served by Granada Reports. Western North Yorkshire (Settle), northern Staffordshire (Biddulph and Kidsgrove) and northwest of Derbyshire (Buxton, Glossop, New Miils and Chapel-en-le-Frith) get their signals from the Winter Hill TV transmitter that broadcasts Granada Reports rather than the neighbouring regions of ITV News Calendar and ITV News Central.

== History ==
When Granada began broadcasting in May 1956, coverage of regional news and sport featured regularly within its programming, including the station's Travelling Eye outside broadcasts.

Within a year, Granada established its first regular bulletin - Northern Newscast - followed by a topical magazine programme, People and Places, noted for featuring some of the earliest television appearances by The Beatles.

In 1958, Granada broke further ground with three Travelling Eye programmes covering the Rochdale by-election.

Up until 1962, the station was also producing topical output in the Welsh language, primarily for Welsh-speaking viewers in North Wales, including daily news bulletins and a magazine programme, Dewch i Mewn (Do Come In).

People and Places was succeeded in January 1963 by the nightly Scene at 6.30. The programme was the first on British television to break news of the assassination of John F. Kennedy, following a tip-off to the Granada newsroom from CBS News.

Granada continued to experiment with its regional news coverage, including late night editions of Scene, and from 1964, a new strand known as Granada in the North (later On Air), which replaced continuity junctions with national and local news summaries, features and programming previews.

Following changes to the company's franchise, including a new brief to solely cover the North West, Scene was axed in 1968 and replaced by six self-contained regional programmes, preceded by a short Granada News bulletin.

Granada reverted back to a nightly magazine programme, under the name of Six-O-One, and latterly Newsday, until settling on the Granada Reports brand in 1973. During its early years, the programme spawned a number of spin-offs, including the social action series Reports Action and the North West political programme Reports Politics.

On 20 September 1978, Joy Division made their television debut on by performing Shadowplay during the programme’s "What's On" segment.

In April 1986, most of Granada's regional news operation was relocated from Manchester to a computerised news centre at the former Traffic Office building in Liverpool's Albert Dock, eight years after the company had first established a news base in the city, based at Exchange Flags.

The flagship evening programme was relaunched as Granada Tonight in January 1990, before returning to the Manchester headquarters in 1992. The Albert Dock news centre continued to produce and broadcast bulletins until 1998 – the studios were finally closed in July 2006.

For much of its run, Granada Tonight placed a greater emphasis on non-news features and entertainment content, with its studio set consisting of sofas and armchairs. On 1 October 2001, the main evening programme reverted back to the Granada Reports brand, while short bulletins continued to air as Granada News.

As of 2013, most bulletins now air under the joint branding of ITV News and Granada Reports with breakfast updates entitled Good Morning Granada.

The programme was unaffected by cutbacks to ITV regional news in early 2009. The only major change saw ITV Granada take over coverage of the Isle of Man from ITV Tyne Tees & Border on 16 July 2009.

On 27 September 2012, it was announced technical staff had been invited to volunteer for redundancy as part of national job losses affecting ITV News services. The timing coincided with production moving from Granada Studios to MediaCityUK. The first bulletin from Salford Quays, presented by Tony Morris, aired on Sunday 24 March 2013.

Long-serving main anchor Lucy Meacock presented her final edition of Granada Reports on 1 August 2024, after 36 years working for ITV Granada.

== Current notable on air team ==
- Mel Barham
- Gamal Fahnbulleh
- Mike Hall
- Tori Lacey
- Elaine Willcox
- Katie Walderman

== Awards ==
- BAFTA Television Awards
  - Best News Coverage: 2007, 2013
- Royal Television Society
  - Best News Coverage in the Nations and Regions: 2007, 2008
  - Best Regional News Programme – North West: 2007, 2009, 2010, 2011, 2012, 2013
  - Best Regional Story – North West: 2010, 2011, 2012, 2013
  - Best Regional on Screen Talent – North West: 2011 (Rob Smith), 2012 (Clare Fallon)
  - Best Innovation in Multimedia – North West: 2012 (Adam McClean)

Preceded by BBC News at Ten: 7 July Bombings	BAFTA: Television Award; News Coverage (The Morecambe Bay Cockling Tragedy); 2007	Succeeded by Sky News: Glasgow Airport Attack
Preceded by BBC Look North: Joanne Nelson Murder Case	RTS: Television Journalism; Nations and Regions News Coverage (The Morecambe Bay Cockling Tragedy); (The Lesley Molseed Trial); 2007, 2008	Succeeded by The West Tonight: Weston Pier Fire
Preceded by Channel 4 News: Japan Earthquake	BAFTA: Television Award; News Coverage (Hillsborough – The Truth at Last); 2013	Succeeded by ITV News at Ten: Woolwich Attacks
