= Lucy Meacock =

British journalist and presenter

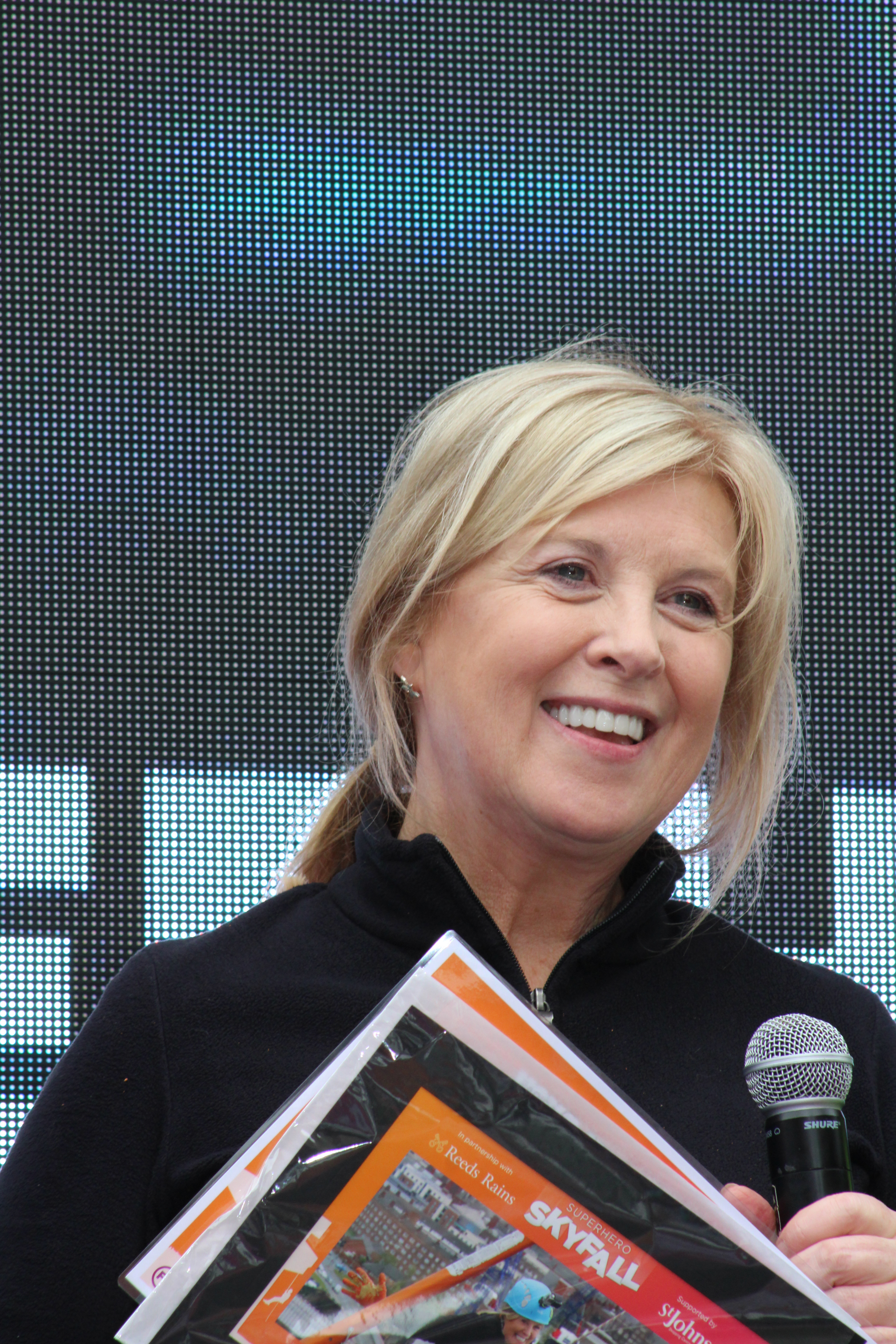
Lucy Meacock in 2018 having just abseiled down Radio City Tower, Liverpool.

Lucy Meacock is a British journalist and broadcaster. She is best known for her work in the North West of England as a main anchor of the ITV regional news programme, Granada Reports between 1988 and 2024.

== Early life and education ==
Meacock was born in South Wales and grew up there before she moved to Chester when she was six. She was educated at the independent school, Ursuline Convent, in Chester. She then moved to Australia, where she attended the independent Morongo Girls College in Geelong, Victoria. After returning to the United Kingdom, she attended the independent Upper Chine School in Shanklin on the Isle of Wight.

== Career ==
Meacock started her journalism career at the Chester Chronicle. She went on to work with BBC Radio Newcastle, before switching to television in 1984, joining the Tyne Tees newsroom as a reporter, and later, presenter of the regional news programme Northern Life.

She later joined BBC South East in 1986 as a presenter for BBC London Plus, then after a brief stint with ITV Anglia, co-presenting a live weekly magazine show called Anglia Live, she joined ITV Granada in 1988.

Meacock won two BAFTA TV Awards for her work on Granada Reports in 2007, following the Morecambe Bay cockling disaster, and again in 2013 for a special programme on the Hillsborough disaster. In 2006, she interviewed the then U.S. Secretary of State, Condoleezza Rice.

Her co-anchors on Granada Reports and Granada Tonight included Bob Greaves, Tony Wilson, Tony Morris and Gamal Fahnbulleh. Meacock went onto present special tribute programmes to both Tony Wilson and Tony Morris following their deaths in 2007 and 2020, respectively.

Apart from her work in regional news, Meacock also presented various regional programmes for Granada, including The Main Ingreident, Origin Unknown, Hearts and Minds and the Friday night debate show UpFront - later revived as The Late Debate - alongside Tony Wilson. She was also a guest presenter for the networked show This Morning from the Albert Dock in Liverpool.

In 2007, she joined ITN as a cover presenter for various ITV News programmes until August 2009, before returning for a second stint between July 2011 and 2015.

In November 2009, Meacock was awarded an honorary degree by the University of Central Lancashire.

In addition to her broadcast work, Meacock hosts various business awards and conferences events, and also mentors new broadcasters, actors and public speakers.

Her charity work has involved climbing Snowdon, cycling from Manchester to Chester and from Chester to Liverpool, sleeping out for the homeless and abseiling down Liverpool's Radio City Tower.

On 16 June 2022, Meacock was installed as Chancellor of the University of Salford.

On 15 July 2024, Meacock announced her departure from ITV Granada after 36 years as a main presenter of Granada Reports. Her final programme followed on 1 August 2024.

== In popular culture ==
St Helens based comedy folk band the Lancashire Hotpots included a song about Meacock on their fifth album Achtung Gravy.

Meacock made a speaking cameo as herself in the video for the 2008 Peter Kay/Geraldine McQueen Christmas single, Once Upon a Christmas Song, which reached Number 5 in the UK Singles Chart during the race for Christmas Number One.
