= Liberia Restoration Party =

Political party in Liberia

- Abbreviation: LRP
- Leader: Allen R. Brown Jr.
- Senate seats: 1 / 30
- House seats: 1 / 73

The Liberia Restoration Party (LRP) is a political party in Liberia.

== History ==
The LRP was certified by the National Elections Commission on June 26, 2017. It is an off-shoot of Liberia Restoration to Christian Heritage, an organization centered around making Liberia into a Christian state. MacDella Cooper was the first standard bearer of the party, and the first presidential candidate. She was the only female presidential candidate in the 2017 election. Her running mate was William R. Slocum. Cooper supported Coalition for Democratic Change (CDC) candidate George Weah in the subsequent run-off election.

The LRP ran 37 candidates in the 2017 House of Representatives election, 11 of them being women. The party won no seats in the legislature. The LRP won no seats in the 2020 Senate election. In a 2021 by-election for the seat representing Grand Gedeh County's 1st House district, LRP candidate Erol Madison Gwion Sr. defeated ruling party CDC candidate Jeremiah Garwo Sokan. Gwion had defected to the LRP from the CDC after the CDC selected Sokan as nominee without holding a primary election.

In March 2023, the LRP convention held in Tubmanburg the convention elected Gabriel H. Salee as National Chairman of LRP, while it elected Allen R. Brown Jr. as standard bearer. By July 2023, LRP Rep. Gwion returned to the CDC. Brown was the LRP presidential candidate in 2023, his running mate being Noosevett J. Weah. In the 2023 House election, the LRP ran 17 candidates. Marie G. Johnson won election in Grand Gedeh County's 2nd House district. In the 2023 Senate election, the LRP ran 3 candidates. Thomas Yaya Nimely won in Grand Gedeh County.

== Election results ==
=== Presidential elections ===
Election	Candidate	Votes	%	Votes	%	Result
Election	Candidate	First round		Second round		Result
2017	MacDella Cooper	11,645	0.75	-	-	Lost ✗
2023	Allen R. Brown Jr.	15,607	0.85	-	-	Lost ✗

=== Senate elections ===
Election	Votes	%	Seats	+/–	Position
2020	7,253	0.82	0 / 30	New	Steady
2023	26,575	1.47	1 / 30	-	▲6th

=== House of Representatives elections ===
Election	Votes	%	Seats	+/–	Position
2017	11,690	0.76	0 / 73	New	Steady
2023	13,604	0.75	1 / 73	▲1	▲7th
