= Gamal Fahnbulleh =

British journalist and TV presenter

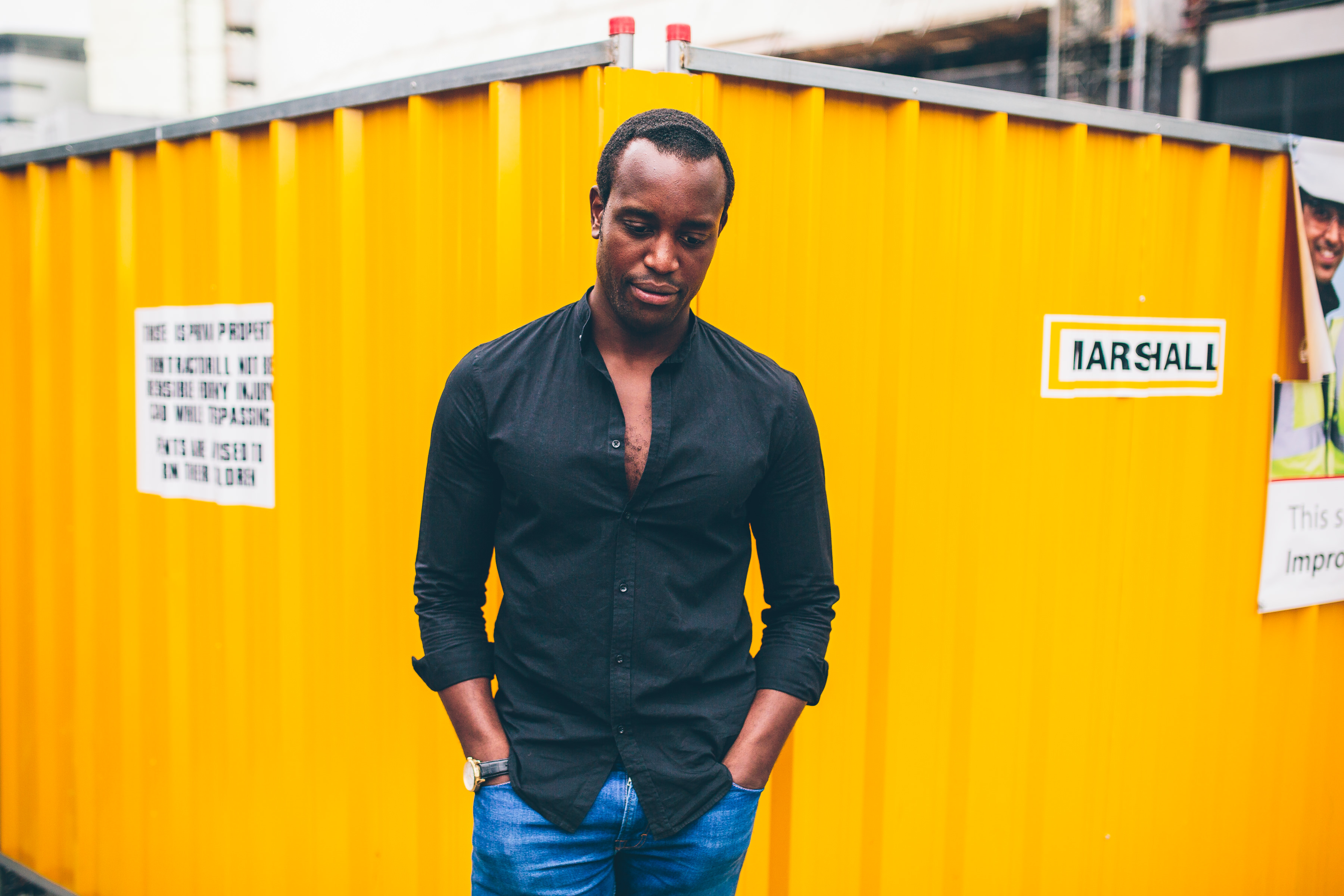
- Born: April 1982 (age 44); Sierra Leone
- Education: University of Manchester; City University London
- Occupations: Television presenter, news presenter
- Employer(s): ITV Granada; Independent Television News (ITN); Sky News
- Relatives: Mary Brownell (grandmother); Miatta Fahnbulleh (sister)

Gamal Fahnbulleh (born April 1982) is a British broadcast journalist and presenter, currently employed by ITV Granada. He presents Granada Reports, an evening news programme for North West England and the Isle of Man. He also is now a relief presenter across all ITV National News programmes.

== Early life ==
Gamal Fahnbulleh was born in April 1982 in Sierra Leone, West Africa. He, his parents and his sister Miatta moved to the UK in the 1980s when he was three years old, settling in Taunton, Somerset.

== Education ==
Fahnbulleh was educated at Taunton School, a boarding independent school in Taunton, followed by the University of Manchester, where he graduated with a BA honours degree in politics and history, followed by a master's degree in international politics. He then enrolled on a postgraduate diploma course in broadcast journalism at City University in London.

== Life and career ==
Fahnbulleh was one of ten successful applicants to the ITV News Bursary Scheme in 2005. He worked for ITN and became a general reporter and programme presenter for Granada Reports on ITV Granada in North West England.

Fahnbulleh joined Sky News in November 2010 as a reporter. He has worked extensively with the British Army and during the summer of 2010 was embedded with the First Battalion, the Duke of Lancaster's Regiment during a six-month tour of Afghanistan. In November of the same year, he was one of the first reporters to cover the student protests in London, and in 2011 reported live on the August riots from both Manchester and Liverpool. In the same year, he became a freelance presenter for Sky World News between 0:00 and 6:00.

In June 2013, he moved to ITV Breakfast as the North of England Correspondent for Daybreak. In August 2014, he rejoined Sky News as a presenter.

From 2017 onwards, Fahnbulleh was one of Sky News' most frequent relief presenters, having appeared on every single time-slot operated by the channel, including News at Ten, Sunrise, Sky News Tonight and Sky News at 5. Farnbulleh was the allocated presenter for Friday from 14:00 to 19:00 while Sarah Hewson was on maternity leave and also presented The News Hour on Fridays.

In January 2021, Fahnbulleh returned to Granada Reports, becoming the main co-presenter of the programme with Lucy Meacock.

Since 2022, Gamal has appeared as a relief presenter on all main ITV News bulletins, including covering on the ITV Evening News for two weeks in August 2023.
