= Mike Hall (journalist) =

Michael Hall, better known as Mike Hall (born 3 April 1974), is an English sports journalist and presenter for ITV regional news programme Granada Reports.

Brought up in Wigan, Hall worked for a local newspaper in the Newton-le-Willows area before joining ITV Granada's sports department in 2000, making his on-screen debut six years later. Alongside sports reporting duties, he is also a stand-in presenter for the programme.

In November 2014, Hall won the award for Broadcast Presenter of the Year at the O2 North West Media Awards.
