= Tiawan Saye Gongloe =

Liberian lawyer, politician, and human rights activist

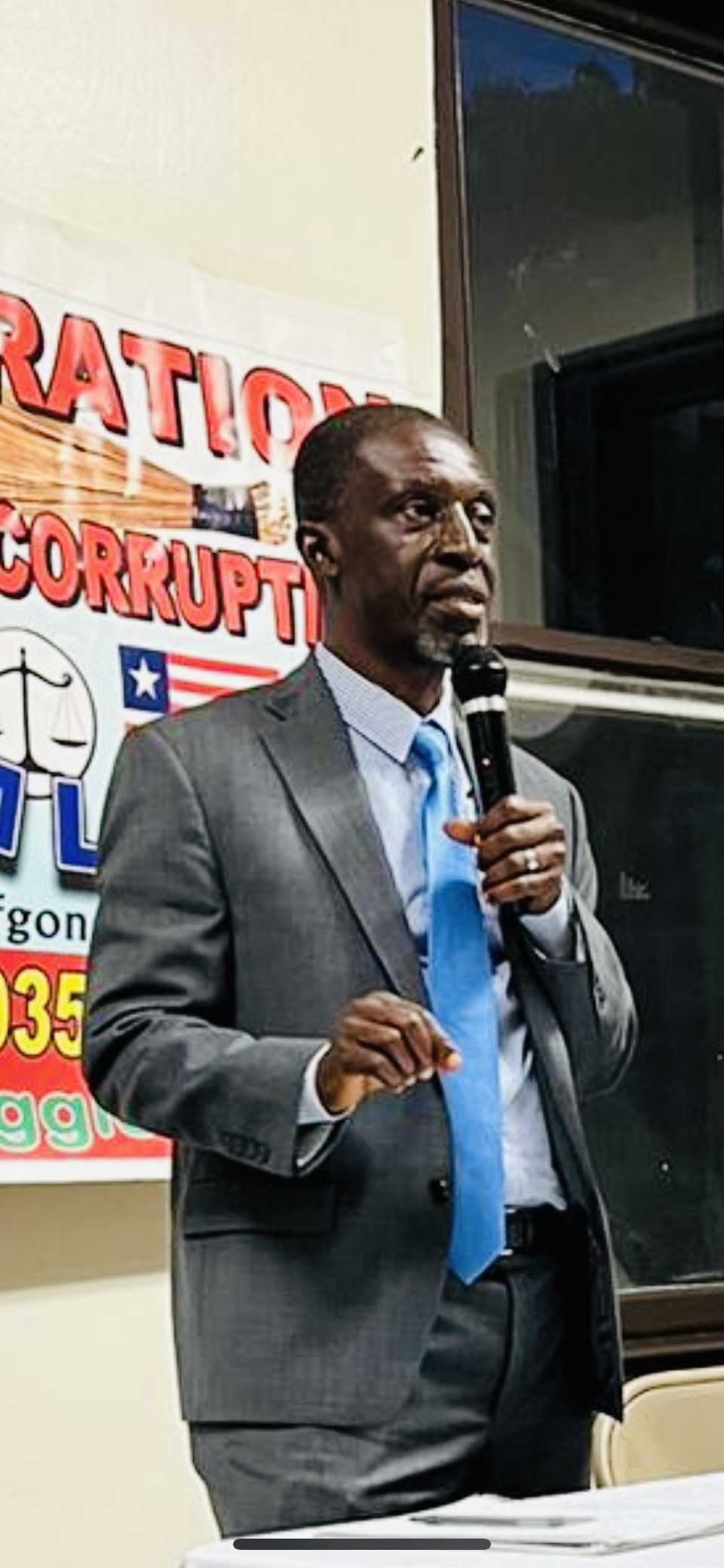

Solicitor General of Liberia
- In office January 2006 – 23 July 2009
- President: Ellen Johnson Sirleaf
- Preceded by: Theophilus Chapman Gould
- Succeeded by: Micah Wilkins Wright

Minister of Labor
- In office 24 July 2009 – 4 November 2010
- President: Ellen Johnson Sirleaf
- Preceded by: Samuel Kofi Woods
- Succeeded by: Vabah Gayflor

Personal details
- Born: August 6, 1956 (age 70) Glehyee-Zorpea, Yarwin-Mehnsonoh Statutory District, Nimba County, Liberia
- Citizenship: Liberia
- Party: Liberian People's Party
- Spouse: Sonie Kolako Gongloe
- Education: University of Liberia (BSc); University of Liberia (LLB)
- Occupation: Lawyer, politician, human rights activist

Tiawan Saye Gongloe is a Liberian lawyer, educator, human rights activist, and politician. He served as Solicitor General (2006–2009) and later Minister of Labor (2010-2011) under President Ellen Johnson Sirleaf. Gongloe has publicly criticized corruption, government abuses, and restrictions on civil liberties in Liberia. Gongloe was the Liberian People's Party's presidential candidate in the 2023 Liberian general election.

== Early life and education ==
Gongloe was born on 6 August 1956 in Glehyee-Zorpea, Nimba County, Liberia to parents Wilfred Kehleboe Gongloe and Elizabeth Menguah Gongloe.

He graduated from the St. Mary's High School in 1976, and subsequently earned both a Bachelor of Science in Economics and Bachelor of Laws from the University of Liberia.

In 1990, he received a certificate in human rights advocacy from Columbia University. He later served as a research fellow at Harvard University's W. E. B. Du Bois Institute and as a fellow at the Carr Center for Human Rights Policy at the Harvard Kennedy School.

== Legal career and activism ==
In 1976, Gongloe joined the Movement for Justice in Africa (MOJA), an pan-African political organization which played a pivotal role in the struggle for social justice and democracy in Liberia in the 1970s.

As a student leader at the University of Liberia, Gongloe participated in political activism during the administration of President William Tolbert. Gongloe was arrested in April 1978 along with other student leaders after opposing the declaration of a national holiday for a visit by U.S. President Jimmy Carter.

Following the 1980 coup d'état, Gongloe joined Amos Sawyer and other MOJA members in founding the Liberian People's Party(LPP) in 1983, the Movement for Justice in Africa (MOJA) political wing. The party sought to participate in the democratic processes in Liberia, including the 1985 election. However, the Party was banned by the People's Redemption Council headed by Samuel Doe.

During the administrations of Samuel Doe and Charles Taylor, Gongloe became one of Liberia’s most prominent human rights lawyers and government critics. He represented political detainees, challenged restrictions on civil liberties, and advocated constitutional governance.

In March 2002, Gongloe addressed the Mano River Union Civil Society Conference in Conakry, Guinea, where he called for peaceful democratic reforms and criticized the use of violence by governments and armed groups. On 24 April 2002, he was arrested by Liberian security forces upon his return to Monrovia. Following interrogation, he was reportedly stripped, detained, and severely beaten while in custody. Gongloe's detention and cruel and inhumane treatment drew international condemnation from organizations including Human Rights Watch, Amnesty International, and other human rights organizations, which described the incident as part of a broader crackdown on political dissent during the Taylor administration.

Following the end of the Second Liberian Civil War, Gongloe worked for a few years in government and resumed legal practice and public advocacy in Liberia.

== Public service ==
After the election of President Ellen Johnson Sirleaf, Gongloe served as Solicitor General of Liberia from 2006 to 2009 and later as Minister of Labor from 2009 to 2010.

Among the cases was the prosecution of former Transitional Chairman Gyude Bryant, who was charged with economic sabotage and accused of misappropriating approximately US$1.4 million in public funds.

His office also prosecuted former Finance Minister Lusinee F. Kamara, former Deputy Finance Minister Tugbeh Doe, and former Minister of Commerce Samuel Wlue on charges relating to the alleged theft of government property following findings contained in the ECOWAS audit concerning the disappearance of millions of dollars in public funds between October 2003 and January 2006.

As Labor Minister, he introduced Regulation No. 17, which increased work permit fees for foreign workers from US$400 to US$1,000. The policy was intended to encourage the employment of qualified Liberian workers while increasing government revenue from work permits.

He resigned from the cabinet in 2010, citing policy disagreements with President Ellen Johnson Sirleaf largely due to her lack of political will to effectively fight corruption. His position was later supported by President Sirleaf’s own public admission at the end of her administration that corruption became a vampire during her administration.

== Academic career ==
Alongside his law practice, Gongloe has contributed to legal and economic education in Liberia.

He served as an Assistant Professor of Law at the Louis Arthur Grimes School of Law and previously taught Economics at the University of Liberia. He has also taught adult literacy at the Loma Community School in Monrovia, and basic knowledge of Constitutional law and Criminal law at the Liberia National Police Training Academy and the Judicial Service Institute.

Gongloe was elected president of the Liberia National Bar Association (LNBA) in 2018 and served a three-year constitutional term, stepping down in late 2021 after his successor was chosen.

Under his administration, the bar for the first time commenced continuing legal education (CLE) and began licensing lawyers based on fulfilling the good standing indicators of the LNBA, including educational qualification, confirmation of admission to the bar, CLE credits, and full payment of bar dues, levies, and professional fees to the Government of Liberia, thereby removing quacks and improving the professional quality of the practice of law in Liberia. His administration constructed the first floor of the LNBA's three-story headquarters.

His more historic achievement as president of the LNBA was the hosting of the 2019 Annual Convention of the African Bar Association (AfBA) in Monrovia, Liberia, the first ever international conference of lawyers held in Liberia, since the formation of the LNBA in 1907. The President of the African Bar Association (AfBA), Hannibal Uwaifo, rated the October 21–24, 2019 Annual Conference in Monrovia, Liberia, "as the best in the history of his administration".

== Political career ==
Gongloe has been involved in Liberian opposition politics for several decades. In 2023, he contested the Liberian presidential election as the candidate of the Liberian People's Party.

During the campaign, Gongloe emphasized anti-corruption reforms, constitutional governance, and judicial independence.

== Personal life ==
Tiawan Saye Gongloe is married to Sonie Kolako Gongloe, and they have children.
