= Miatta Fahnbulleh =

British politician (born 1979)

The Right Honourable Miatta Fahnbulleh MP
- Official portrait, 2026

Secretary of State for Energy Security and Net Zero
- Incumbent
- Assumed office 20 July 2026
- Prime Minister: Andy Burnham
- Preceded by: Ed Miliband
Junior ministerial offices
Parliamentary Under-Secretary of State for Devolution, Faith and Communities
In office 6 September 2025 – 12 May 2026
Prime Minister	Keir Starmer
Preceded by	Jim McMahon (English Devolution); The Lord Khan of Burnley (Faith and Communities)
Succeeded by	Nesil Caliskan (Devolution and Communities); The Lord Lemos (Faith)
Parliamentary Under-Secretary of State for Energy Consumers
In office 9 July 2024 – 6 September 2025
Prime Minister	Keir Starmer
Preceded by	Amanda Solloway
Succeeded by	Martin McCluskey

Member of Parliament for Peckham
- Incumbent
- Assumed office 4 July 2024
- Preceded by: Harriet Harman
- Majority: 15,228 (39.3%)

Personal details
- Born: Miatta Nema Fahnbulleh; 29 September 1979 (age 47) Liberia
- Party: Labour Co-op
- Spouse: Graham
- Relations: Gamal Fahnbulleh (brother); Miatta Fahnbulleh (aunt); Mary Brownell (grandmother)
- Children: 3
- Parent: Henry Boimah Fahnbulleh (father)
- Education: Lincoln College, Oxford (BA); London School of Economics (MA, PhD)
- Website: miattafahnbulleh.org

Miatta Nema Fahnbulleh (born 29 September 1979) is a British-Liberian politician and economist who has served as Secretary of State for Energy Security and Net Zero since July 2026. As a member of the Labour and Co-operative Party, she was elected as Member of Parliament (MP) for Peckham in the 2024 general election. She is considered to belong to the soft left of the Labour Party.

Fahnbulleh previously served as a Parliamentary Under-Secretary of State in the Ministry of Housing, Communities and Local Government from 2025 to 2026.

In her tenure as Energy Secretary, she has approved licenses for drilling gas at Jackdaw gas field.

== Early life and education ==
Fahnbulleh was born on 29 September 1979 in Liberia. She is a daughter of Henry Boimah Fahnbulleh, a former Foreign Minister of Liberia; her mother is from Sierra Leone. She was named after her aunt, the singer Miatta Fahnbulleh. She has a brother, Gamal. At the onset of the First Liberian Civil War in 1986 the family fled to the United Kingdom, where they applied for asylum.

Fahnbulleh attended Beechwood Sacred Heart School, an independent school in Tunbridge Wells. After studying philosophy, politics and economics at Lincoln College, Oxford, she graduated from the University of Oxford with a Bachelor of Arts (BA) degree in 2000. She obtained a Doctor of Philosophy (PhD) degree in economic development in 2005 from the London School of Economics. Fahnbulleh wrote her thesis on the adoption of and success of industrial policy in Ghana and Kenya.

== Early career ==
Fahnbulleh was the Head of Cities in the policy unit at the Cabinet Office from 2011 to 2013; the director of policy and research at the IPPR from December 2016 to November 2017; and the Chief Executive of the New Economics Foundation between November 2017 and December 2023. She was also a Policy Fellow at the think tank Labour Together.

On 22 May 2022, Fahnbulleh was a recipient of the MotheRED grant, which provides funding for mothers to stand as parliamentary candidates for the Labour Party. In September 2022, Fahnbulleh announced that she was standing to be the prospective parliamentary candidate in Camberwell and Peckham at the next general election. On 19 November 2022, she was selected by local Labour Party members as the candidate to succeed Harriet Harman, who stood down after 40 years.

While still a Parliamentary candidate, in June 2024 the New Statesman named Fahnbulleh 47th in The Left Power List 2024, the magazine's "guide to the 50 most influential people in progressive politics", describing her as "a natural candidate to join the front bench".

Fahnbulleh has been a regular panellist on the BBC television programme Question Time.

== Parliamentary career ==
In the 2024 general election, Fahnbulleh was elected in a new seat called Peckham, with a lower share of the vote than Labour had had in 2019 in Camberwell and Peckham. On 9 July 2024, she was appointed as Parliamentary Under-Secretary of State for Energy Consumers. In the 2025 cabinet reshuffle, she became Parliamentary Under-Secretary of State for Devolution, Faith and Communities.

In May 2026, Fahnbulleh resigned as a minister in support of calls for Keir Starmer to step down as Prime Minister following the 2026 UK local elections. In July 2026 she was appointed Secretary of State for Energy Security and Net Zero under Andy Burnham.

In October 2026, Fahnbulleh approved drilling for gas in the Jackdaw gas field. Production will begin at the beginning of the month. She is yet to decide whether to grant licenses for oil production at Rosebank oil and gas field. Subsequently, she was criticised by Lindsay Hoyle for failing to announce the decision in the House of Commons of the United Kingdom. Hoyle described the failure as "shameful."

== Political views ==
Fahnbulleh is a member of the Labour and Co-operative parties. Ideologically, she is considered to belong to the soft left of the Labour Party. A left-wing economist, she has described herself as a heterodox economist and has advocated for change to the economic system.

In autumn 2026, Fahnbulleh indicated she opposes Shabana Mahmood's immigration reform policy.

Following her appointment as Secretary of State for Energy Security and Net Zero in July 2026, environmental organizations like Friends of the Earth have called on Fahnbulleh to limit fossil fuel expansions and focus on renewables.

== Personal life ==
Fahnbulleh is married and has three children.

== Honours ==
On 21 July 2026 Fahnbulleh was sworn in as a member of the Privy Council, entitling her to the honorific style The Right Honourable for life.
