= Tony Morris =

British newsreader (1962–2020)

- Born: Anthony Clive Morris; 30 September 1962; Portsmouth, Hampshire, England
- Died: 1 August 2020 (aged 57); Bury, Greater Manchester, England
- Occupation: Newsreader
- Employer(s): ITV Granada; ITN; BBC
- Television: ITV's Granada Reports; ITV Weekend News; BBC North West Tonight
- Children: 2

Anthony Clive Morris (30 September 1962 – 1 August 2020) was an English newsreader for Granada Reports, produced by ITV Granada. He previously worked as a reporter and bulletin presenter for BBC North West Tonight and for a brief period was a reporter for the BBC national news.

== Biography ==
=== Early life ===
Morris was born and brought up in the city of Portsmouth in Hampshire, but later moved to St Helens, Merseyside.

=== Education ===
Morris was educated at St. Luke's Church of England School, now known as the Ark Charter Academy, in the Southsea area of Portsmouth.

=== Career ===
Prior to being a television journalist and news presenter, Morris worked as a DJ and served in the RAF.

=== BBC ===
==== North West Tonight ====
Morris joined BBC North West Tonight initially as a reporter for the flagship programme based in Manchester, later going on to present shorter bulletins, usually weekend bulletins and the regional bulletin following the BBC News at Ten. For a brief period in his latter years with the BBC, he worked as a reporter for the national news, being based in London.

==== The Really Useful Show ====
Morris also co-hosted BBC Birmingham's morning programme The Really Useful Show, in 1997.

=== ITV ===
==== Granada Reports ====
In 2003, Morris joined ITV Granada as the new male co-anchor alongside Lucy Meacock for Granada Reports. This came following the departures of Tony Wilson and So Rahman. More recently, he had alternate lunchtime and late bulletins added to his role. He celebrated 10 years on Granada Reports in September 2013. The programme became the first regional news programme ever to win a BAFTA.

==== ITV Weekend News ====
In 2007, Morris stood-in on the ITV Weekend News, which followed Granada Reports.

=== Personal life and death ===
Morris had two adult daughters. He died at Bury Hospice on 1 August 2020, aged 57. He had been diagnosed with kidney cancer in 2019. The 3rd August 2020 edition of Granada Reports served as a tribute programme to Morris.
