= Elaine Willcox =

English television reporter

Elaine Willcox is an English television reporter. She is currently employed by ITV Granada.

== Media career ==
Willcox was part of a team which won a BAFTA in 2007 for covering the impact of the Morecambe Bay cockling disaster for ITV Granada. This, to date, is the only occasion when a BAFTA has gone to a regional news programme.

In September 2007 she joined GMTV as North West England Correspondent. After three years, she returned to ITV Granada as a reporter for regional news programme Granada Reports.
