= Telia Urey =

Liberian business executive, philanthropist and politician

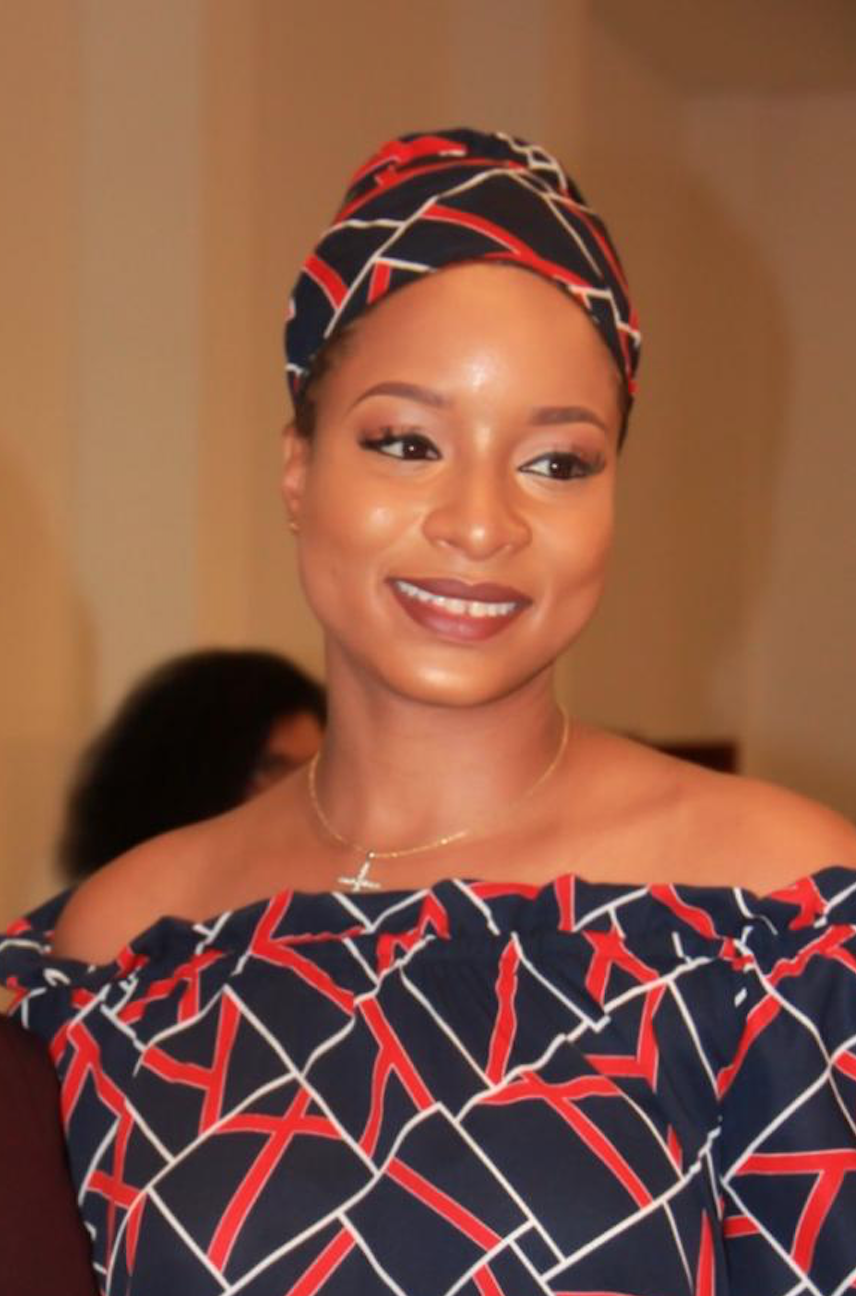
- Occupations: Businesswoman, politician, philanthropist
- Father: Benoni Urey

Telia Urey is a Liberian businesswoman, philanthropist, and politician. Urey is the daughter of the Liberian businessman and politician Benoni Urey. In 2019, she contested in a representative election in Liberia, where she ran on a ticket of coalition of four political parties: All Liberian Party, Liberty Party, Alternative National Congress, and former ruling Unity Party- the party of former president Ellen Johnson-Sirleaf.

== Early life and education ==
Urey completed most of her primary and secondary education in Liberia and Ghana, before leaving for Canada to attend Columbia International College and McGill University in Hamilton, Ontario and Montreal, Quebec, respectively. She studied political science and sociology.

== Career ==
Urey opened Melyke Hair in Canada in 2009, wholesaling and retailing hair and hair products to companies and women in Canada, Liberia, Cameroon, and Ghana. In 2010, Urey went on to open The Pet Store - the first post-war veterinary clinic in Liberia, located on 4th Street in Sinkor. The Pet Store brought relief to many livestock farmers who reportedly were losing their animals due to the lack of veterinary services in the country.

In 2011, Urey formed Core Investment Group, a real estate development company with residential and commercial developments across Liberia.

Urey is also the owner of the Liberian restaurant Fuzion d’Afrique, established in 2015 and located in Monrovia, Liberia. The restaurant hosts charitable events including the monthly “Made in Liberia Fair”, organized in collaboration with the Liberia Business Association and the Liberia Chamber of Commerce, which is a forum where goods and services produced and offered in Liberia are displayed and sold.

In 2019, she was nominated for “Female Entrepreneur of The Year” Award by Liberian Youth Awards.

== Politics ==
Urey has been in political advocacy for over 9 years, been a part of protests for social justice and economic change, supported civil society movements, engaged the media, supported candidates and political campaigns in her fight for change.

In 2019, Urey contested a representative by-election in District 15 in Montserrado County. She contested on the ticket of the Collaborating Political Parties. She came second in the election and was publicly praised for effective competition by President Ellen Johnson Sirleaf, who supported her candidacy.

== Personal life ==
She is the daughter of Liberian businessman and politician Benoni Urey and businesswoman and philanthropist, Mai B. Urey. She has three siblings.
