= Liberian People's Party =

Political party in Liberia

- Abbreviation: LPP
- Chairman: Yanqui Zaza
- General Secretary: Leon Talery
- Founder: Amos Claudius Sawyer
- Founded: 1983
- Ideology: Pan-Africanism; Democratic socialism
- Political position: Left-wing
- National affiliation: Movement for Justice in Africa
- Colours: Red
- Seats in the Senate: 0 / 30
- Seats in the House: 1 / 73

Website
- https://www.liberianpeopleparty.org/

The Liberian People's Party (LPP) is a political party in Liberia.

LPP formed in 1983 as the electoral wing of the Movement for Justice in Africa (MOJA), a leftist pan-African group. Party member Amos Sawyer served as President of the Interim Government of National Unity (IGNU) in 1990–94.

In elections held on 19 July 1997, the LPP presidential candidate and veteran leader Togba-Nah Tipoteh won 1.61% of the vote. The party won 1 out of 64 seats in the House of Representatives and none in the Senate. While international observers deemed the polls administratively free and transparent, they noted that it had taken place in an atmosphere of intimidation because most voters believed that former rebel leader and National Patriotic Party (NPP) candidate Charles Taylor would return to war if defeated.

In the 11 October 2005 elections, the Liberian People's Party and the United People's Party participated as part of the Alliance for Peace and Democracy (APD), supporting Togba-Nah Tipoteh for president.

In the 2011 presidential and legislative elections, both parties were part of the National Democratic Coalition, backing Dew Mayson for president. In the same elections Togba-Nah Tipoteh ran for the Freedom Alliance Party of Liberia (FAPL).

The party contested alone the 2017 Liberian general election, with Henry Boimah Fahnbulleh, who had previously resigned as national security advisor to the incumbent president Ellen Johnson Sirleaf, running for the presidency. Fanbulleh classified ninth with only 0.74% of the votes, while the party obtained 1.58% of the votes and secured one seat in the House of Representatives.

The LPP did not contest the 2020 Senate election. In October 2022 Yanqui Zaza was elected new party chairman during the party’s 5th extraordinary national congress, putting an end to Joseph Kolako Kpator Jallah's 17 years long leadership. In the following year's general election the party fielded Tiawan Saye Gongloe as presidential candidate.

== Election results ==
=== Presidential elections ===
Election	Candidate	Votes	%	Votes	%	Result
Election	Candidate	First round		Second round		Result
1997	Togba-Nah Tipoteh	10,010	1.61	-	-	Lost ✗
2005	Togba-Nah Tipoteh (As part of APD)	22,766	2.34	-	-	Lost ✗
2011	Dew Tuan-Wleh Mayson (As part of NDC)	22,766	2.34	-	-	Lost ✗
2017	Henry Boimah Fahnbulleh	11,560	0.74	-	-	Lost ✗
2023	Tiawan Saye Gongloe	26,394	1.44	-	-	Lost ✗

=== Senate elections ===
Election	Votes	%	Seats	+/–	Position
2005	119,091; As part of APD	7.04	3 / 30	New	▲6th
2011	41,717; As part of NDC	3.49	1 / 30	-2	▼7th
2014	5,726; As part of NDC	1.25	1 / 30	0	▼8th
2020	659; As part of NDC	0.07	1 / 30	0	▲6th
2023	39,718	2.19	0 / 30	-1	▲7th

=== House of Representatives elections ===
Election	Votes	%	Seats	+/–	Position
2005	38,285; As part of APD	4.09	5 / 64	New	▲6th
2011	70,580; As part of NDC	5.93	5 / 64	0	▲4th
2017	24,287	1.58	1 / 73	-4	▼8th
2023	35,400	1.95	0 / 73	-1	▼8th
