= Grassroots Development Movement =

Political party in Liberia

The Grassroots Development Movement (GDM) is a political party in Liberia. The GDM was certified by the National Elections Commission in May 2023. The party ran in the 2023 Liberian elections and won no seats in the Senate or House of Representatives and received 2.2% of the vote in the presidential elections. After being defeated in the first round of elections, the party's presidential candidate Edward W. Appleton, Jr. endorsed the Unity Party candidate Joseph Boakai.

== Controversies ==
In voting precinct code 304005 the GDM was marked as the party for both Edward W. Appleton and VOLT candidate Jeremiah Whapoe on presidential record of count sheets.
