= James Fromayan =

James Fromayan is a former chairman of the Liberian National Election Commission and former executive director of Liberia Democracy Resource Center, former project manager, Seeds and Tools Project, Catholic Relief Services. He has also served as assistant minister for administration, Ministry of Education, and as minister of education. He also taught at the University of Liberia and served as vice principal of the Voinjama Multilateral High School.

== Early life and education ==
Fromayan was born in 1950 in Zorzor, Lofa County, Liberia. He has an MA degree in politics and development strategies from the Institute of Social Studies, Netherlands, a BA degree in international relations from the University of Liberia.
