= Garworlohn Township =

Township in Liberia

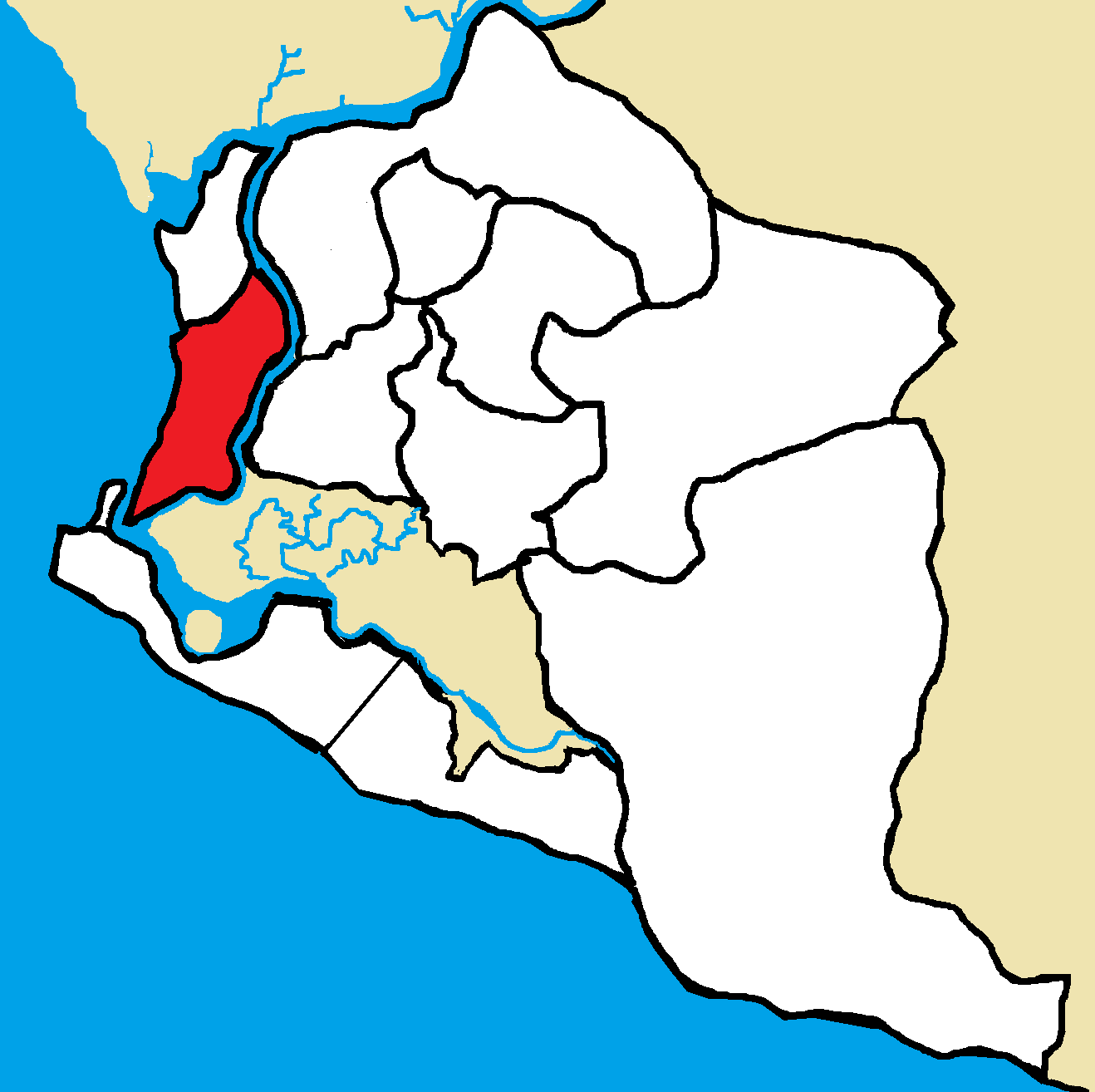
Garworlohn Township within the Greater Monrovia District.

The Garworlohn Township is a township of the Greater Monrovia District, Montserrado County, Liberia. It is located on Bushrod Island, and stretches from Vai Town in the south to Bong Mines Bridge in the north. Politically, Garworlohn Township is divided between the Montserrado-13, Montserrado-14 and Montserrado-15 electoral districts.

During the presidency of Ellen Johnson-Sirleaf, Willametta Gooding Carlos served as commissioner of Garworlohn Township. Beatrice Dolee Williams was named commissioner by President George Weah in 2018.

== Communities of Garworlohn Township ==
Community	Inhabitants (2014 est.)	No. of Households (2014 est.)	Electoral district
Blamo Town	7,105	1,733	Montserrado-15
Central Logan Town	6,749	1,646	Montserrado-15
Free Port Development	194	47	Montserrado-15
Gbandi Town	5,277	1,287	Montserrado-15
Jamaica Road	8,306	2,026	Montserrado-13
King Peter Town	4,924	1,201	Montserrado-15
Little White Chapel	7,741	1,888	Montserrado-15
Stockton Creek	2,253	549	Montserrado-13
Vicky Spot	3,404	830	Montserrado-15
Zinc Camp	9,219	2,248	Montserrado-15
Zondo Town	8,077	1,970	Montserrado-15
Central Clara Town I	5,968	1,456	Montserrado-14
Central Clara Town II	7,356	1,794	Montserrado-14
Cow Factory	9,799	2,390	Montserrado-14
Free Port Community	5,810	1,417	Montserrado-14
Giblata	2,164	528	Montserrado-14
Hope Community	6,441	1,571	Montserrado-14
Paity Town	5,488	1,338	Montserrado-14
Peugeot Garage	4,013	979	Montserrado-14
River View	4,832	1,179	Montserrado-14
Struggle Community	7,652	1,866	Montserrado-14
Vai Town A	1,468	358	Montserrado-14
Vai Town B	2,367	577	Montserrado-14
