= Clarence Moniba =

Liberian politician, academic, and author

Clarence K. Moniba

Personal details
- Party: Liberian National Union
- Parent: Harry F. Moniba
- Education: New Mexico State University; Harvard Kennedy School

Clarence K. Moniba is a Liberian politician, academic, and author. He is the political leader of the Liberian National Union (LINU) and was a candidate for president of Liberia in the 2023 Liberian general election. He previously served as Liberia's Minister of State without Portfolio and as Chairman of the Board of the Liberia Electricity Corporation (LEC).

Moniba is an Associate Professor of Practice in Leadership & Ethics; Management & Delivery at the African School of Governance (ASG) in Kigali, Rwanda, where he teaches leadership, management, and delivery. His academic work includes The WHO and HOW of Ethical Leadership and The Two Births of Ethical Leadership.

== Academic career ==
Moniba is an Associate Professor of Practice in Leadership & Ethics; Management & Delivery at the African School of Governance in Kigali. He is also an adjunct faculty member at ASG, where he teaches leadership, management, and delivery.

His academic and professional work focuses on leadership, ethics, management, governance, and public-sector delivery. He has also participated in leadership and governance programs involving public officials and political leaders in Africa and internationally.

== Political career ==
Moniba became political leader of the Liberian National Union in December 2022. He was the party's candidate for president in the 2023 Liberian general election, campaigning under the platform A New Liberia.

In the 2023 presidential election, the National Elections Commission recorded 5,298 votes for Moniba, representing 0.29% of the national vote in the first round.

His campaign emphasized economic development, agricultural production, infrastructure, education, youth development, and technical and vocational training. Among his proposals were expanded domestic agricultural production and greater access to technical and vocational education.

Following the 2023 election, Moniba continued his political activities as leader of LINU and remained active in national political debates.

== Government and international development ==
Before entering national government, Moniba worked in international development and post-conflict governance. He worked with the African Development Bank High-Level Panel on Post-Conflict and Fragile States and with the United Nations Post-2015 Development Agenda.

From 2014 to 2018, Moniba served in senior positions in the administration of President Ellen Johnson Sirleaf. He was Principal Advisor and Project Manager to the President and led the Diaspora Engagement Unit, the Philanthropy Secretariat, and the President's Delivery Unit.

He served as Chairman of the Board of the Liberia Electricity Corporation and later as Minister of State without Portfolio. Contemporary profiles described him as the youngest person in Liberia's history to hold the Minister of State without Portfolio position and the youngest person to serve as chairman of the Liberia Electricity Corporation.

In 2018, Moniba was awarded the Knight Commander of the Most Venerable Order of Pioneers of Liberia for his service in government.

== Philanthropy ==
Moniba is Chairman of the Moniba Foundation, a nonprofit organization involved in education, youth leadership, women's empowerment, economic opportunity, and community development in Liberia.

Through the foundation, he has supported scholarships for Liberian students at the high school, vocational and technical, and university levels. The foundation also provides leadership awards and supports programs intended to expand educational opportunities for young Liberians.

== Early life and education ==
Moniba is the youngest son of Harry F. Moniba, who served as Vice President of Liberia from 1984 to 1990.

He attended New Mexico State University and played college football for the New Mexico State Aggies. New Mexico State's official 2000 football statistics list Moniba as a player who appeared during the season.

Moniba earned a master's degree in Government, a Master of Public Administration from Harvard Kennedy School, and a Ph.D. in Rhetoric and Professional Communications from New Mexico State University.

== Football and film ==
After playing college football, Moniba played professional arena football with the Cape Fear Wildcats of AF2. Contemporary league coverage identified him as a defensive player for Cape Fear and credited him with six tackles, an interception, and a pass defended in a 2002 game against the Mohegan Wolves. In a 2002 playoff game, he also made a defensive play that helped set up a Cape Fear touchdown.

Moniba also performed football stunts in the films Radio (2003), Invincible (2006), and We Are Marshall (2006).

== Author ==
In 2011, Moniba published The Official Guidebook to a College Football Scholarship.
