= Vision for Liberia Transformation =

Political party in Liberia

Vision for Liberia Transformation Party
- Abbreviation: VOLT
- Leader: Jeremiah Z. Whapoe
- Senate seats: 0 / 30
- House seats: 1 / 73

The Vision for Liberia Transformation (VOLT) is a political party in Liberia.

== History ==
VOLT was certified by the National Elections Commission (NEC) in May 2016. Dr. Jeremiah Z. Whapoe was the party's first presidential candidate. Whapoe is a social entrepreneur and a nephew of notable 20th-century Liberian politician Jackson Doe. Rodney Sieh of FrontPage Africa wrote that Whapoe "prioritized agriculture on the campaign trail". On July 11, 2017, Whapoe announced that VOLT had selected former assistant agriculture minister Isaac Flowers of Bomi County as the party's running mate. In the 2017 presidential election, Whapoe received 3,946 votes, 0.3% of the total vote. In the subsequent run-off election, Whapoe supported Unity Party (UP) candidate Joseph Boakai. In the 2017 House of Representatives election, VOLT ran 25 candidates. None won election.

On August 31, 2020, the NEC certified the Rainbow Alliance (RA). The political alliance initially contained VOLT, along with six other parties. The RA planned to contest the 2023 presidential election. In 2020, the RA contested the Senate election. None of its candidates were elected. By March 2022, VOLT had withdrawn from the RA.

Whapoe again contested the presidency with VOLT in the 2023 election. On July 6, Whapoe had announced that VOLT had selected Erasmus Daoda Fahnbulleh as his running mate. Fahnbulleh was the chairman of VOLT, as well as a former employee of the Ministry of Agriculture. In the 2023 election, in one precinct code, "GDM", the acronym for the Grassroots Development Movement, appeared on the ballot twice, once beside GDM candidate Edward W. Appleton's name, and once beside Whapoe's name, instead of the appropriate acronym "VOLT". After the election, Whapoe claimed that the NEC had intentionally printed the flawed ballots to divert votes from VOLT to the GDM. In the subsequent run-off election, Whapoe again endorsed UP candidate Boakai. In the 2023 legislative elections, VOLT ran 10 candidates in the House and 1 candidate in the Senate. Gbessie Sonii Feika was elected to the House in Grand Cape Mount County's 3rd district.
