= Jackdaw gas field =

Large offshore natural gas field in the North Sea

Jackdaw
- Country: United Kingdom
- Region: Central North Sea
- Location/blocks: 30/02a, 30/02d, 30/03a
- Offshore/onshore: Offshore
- Coordinates: 56°54′3.73″N 2°22′50.73″E
- Operator: Shell UK
- Owner: Adura

Field history
- Discovery: 2005

Production
- Current production of gas: 200×10^{6} cu ft/d (5.7×10^{6} m^{3}/d)
- Estimated gas in place: 200 million barrels oil equivalent
- Producing formations: Upper Jurassic

Jackdaw gas field is a large offshore natural gas field which lies in Blocks 30/02a, 30/02d and 30/03a in the central North Sea, 240 kilometres (150 mi) east of Aberdeen. It has been owned by Adura, a joint venture between Shell and Equinor, since 2025.

The Jackdaw field is being developed as a 'not permanently attended' platform in a water depth of 78 metres (256 ft), 30 kilometres (19 mi) south east of the Shearwater installation to which fluids from Jackdaw are exported. The field was approved by the UK Government in 2022, but was subject to a high court challenge, and then approval was granted again in October 2026.

== Environmental impact ==
The gas field is estimated to produce approximately 23 million tonnes of carbon dioxide emissions over its lifetime – 15% from operations (construction, extraction, processing and decommissioning) and 85% from consumers burning the gas.

== The Jackdaw reservoir ==
The reservoir is in the Upper Jurassic Heather Formation and is compartmentalised into two separate reservoir units. The properties of the reservoir and the fluids are as follows.

Jackdaw reservoir properties
Property	Value
Fluid type	Gas / gas condensate
Initial reservoir pressure (psi at datum 5,174 m TVDss)	17,158
Initial reservoir temperature (°C)	191
Formation volume factor (cf/scf)	0.002528 – 0.002759
Dew point (psi)	6,351 – 6,450
Gas viscosity (cP)	0.051 – 0.0648
Gas density (g/cm^{3})	0.351 – 0.4293
Gas condensate API gravity (°)	34.9 – 49
Wax (% wt at -36 °C)	17
Wax appearance temperature (°C)	46
Asphaltene content (wt %)	0
Carbon dioxide (CO_{2}) (mol %)	4.2
Hydrogen sulphide (H_{2}S)(ppmv)	30
Mercury (Hg)(ng/m^{3} (gas))	350
Mercury (Hg) (μg/kg (condensate))	15

The Jackdaw field is classified as an ultra high pressure high temperature (uHPHT) field. Such fields are defined as having a reservoir pressure greater than 12,500 psi, and a temperature exceeding 166 °C.

== Fluid production ==
The Jackdaw wellhead platform (WHP) is a four-leg installation located at 56°54′3.73″N 2°22′50.73″E. The installation supports four wellheads. No hydrocarbon processing takes place on Jackdaw; the well fluids are sent to Shearwater for processing. The topsides pipework is rated for the full shut-in pressure of the wells. Transfer of fluids from Jackdaw to Shearwater is through a 31-kilometre (19 mi) long pipeline 300-millimetre (12 in) internal diameter, 460-millimetre (18 in) outside diameter pipe-in-pipe. (Note: Offshore gas pipe-in-pipe (PiP) systems consist of an inner carrier pipe that transports the gas and an outer jacket pipe that protects the system from seawater pressure and mechanical damage, with thermal insulation sealed in the annulus space between them.) A pipeline overpressure protection system (OPPS) protects the pipeline from the wellhead pressure.
