= Movement for Justice in Africa =

Political organization in Liberia

- Founded: 1973
- Ideology: Social democracy Democratic socialism Pan-Africanism
- Political position: Centre-left to left-wing
- National affiliation: Liberian People's Party

Movement for Justice in Africa (MOJA) is a pan-African political organization in Liberia, with chapters in Ghana and The Gambia. It was founded in 1973 by Togba Nah Tipoteh, who is currently its president.

== Liberia ==
Early members include Henry Boimah Fahnbulleh, Dew Tuan-Wreh Mason, and Amb. Conmany B. Wesseh Sr, who is currently a senator representing River Gee County. Amos Sawyer, who served as president of the Interim Government of National Unity (IGNU) in 1990–94, and Kukoi Samba Sanyang, a Gambian revolutionary who had been one of the leaders of a coup attempt in Banjul in 1981.

MOJA played an important role in the struggle for social justice and democracy in Liberia. Its sensitization work in the 1970s raised national political consciousness to an unprecedentedly high level, radicalizing the mass of urban and rural poor and sections of the military. The heightened political consciousness and agitation it caused led to the collapse of the settler oligarchy that had ruled Liberia in a colonial manner for over a century.

MOJA participates in elections under the name Liberian People's Party.

== Gambia ==
An Africa Contemporary Record in Gambia states that the group Movement for Justice in Africa (Moja-G) published an underground newspaper, The Voice of the Future. The group was prosecuted for publishing an underground newspaper, but leaders of Moja-G technically escaped prosecution. It drew support from disaffected youth in the Banjul-Serrekunda conurbation. The group attacked the People's Progressive Party (PPP) and the country's colonial past. The Europa publication, Africa South of the Sahara 1989, further states that Moja-G had an ideological affinity with a movement of the same name in Liberia, which worked for an overthrow of the Tolbert regime in that country.

MOJA has waned significancantly in recent years; but in early 2007, efforts aimed at reviving the movement were initiated. The group operated as a self-styled Marxist group, rejecting parliamentary opposition as futile and advocated extreme political measures. In Gambia's Pre-Crisis phase of political evolution (February 18, 1965 – October 26, 1980), after the PPP political party won the elections, the Movement for Justice in Africa – Gambia (MOJA-Gambia) was established by Koro Sallah in 1979 as part of the response to the PPP. However, during the Crisis Phase (October 27, 1980 – February 8, 1985), two opposition groups, MOJA-Gambia and the Gambia Socialist Revolutionary Party (GSRP) headed by Pingon Georges, were banned by President Jawara for their involvement in the rebellion on November 1, 1980. Dissident Movements and Degenhardt's Revolutionary states that authorities were investigating the group for burning boats in Gambian ports. They also stated that Koro Sallah, the founder of Moja-G, was killed in an attempted coup in July 1981.
