= Miatta Fahnbulleh (singer) =

Liberian singer and social activist

- Born: Monrovia, Liberia
- Occupations: Singer, song writer, social activist
- Mother: Mary Brownell
- Relatives: Henry Boimah Fahnbulleh, Jr. (brother); Miatta Fahnbulleh (niece)

Miatta Fahnbulleh is a Liberian singer and social activist. As of May 2017, she was the interim coordinator of Concerned Citizens to Protect the Constitution.

== Early life ==
Born and raised in Monrovia, Liberia, Fahnbulleh is the daughter of H. Boimah Fahnbulleh, Sr, a politician and diplomat, and Mary Brownell, a women's advocate and one-time Liberia's Goodwill Ambassador for Maternal and Child Health. She is the elder sister to Henry Boimah Fahnbulleh, Jr., a former Foreign Minister and National Security Adviser. British Labour Co-op MP Miatta Fahnbulleh is her niece and namesake.

Fahnbulleh graduated from high school in Sierra Leone, where her father was ambassador from Liberia. She wanted to be a singer, but social obstacles in her home country against women performing in public venues led her to seek opportunities elsewhere. She attended junior college in Kenya, returning to Liberia after dropping out. After singing for a time in Monrovia, she then left for the United States in 1968 to study journalism.

== Career ==
While in the United States, Fahnbulleh studied at the American Musical and Dramatic Academy. She also performed, singing at the Apollo Theater in Harlem and working with the Negro Ensemble Company of New York.

In 1973, she visited Liberia to sing at the inauguration of President William R. Tolbert Jr., and moved back altogether in 1974. She toured Europe and West Africa and worked with Hugh Masekela, touring the United States with him in 1976. In 1977, she performed at the World Black Festival of Arts and Culture, FESTAC 77, in Lagos, Nigeria.

Fahnbulleh moved to England in 1977, where she remained, and performed, for seven years until returning again to Liberia. Since then, she has become a strong advocate for women's and children's issues. She has advocated for greater inclusion of women in high government positions, and in 2005 she founded the school Obaa's Girls Educational Outreach (OGEO), which "offers more than 180 scholarships to girls whom she hopes will become Liberia’s next generation of leaders." She made a bid for the Liberian senate in 2014. She has represented the Ministry of Health as Goodwill Ambassador for Maternal Mortality Reduction and Child Health. As of May 2017, she was the interim coordinator of Concerned Citizens to Protect the Constitution.

She features as narrator of the 2016 documentary The Land Beneath Our Feet, on land issues in Liberia.

== Selected discography ==
- In Kokolioko (1979)
- Miatta (1979)
- Just 4-U (1989)
- The Message Of The Revolution (1981)

== See also ==
- List of Liberian musicians
