= Henry Boimah Fahnbulleh =

Liberian politician and diplomat

Henry Boimah Fahnbulleh, Jr.
- Born: July 16, 1949 (age 77); Monrovia, Liberia
- Occupations: Politician and diplomat
- Relatives: Miatta Fahnbulleh (daughter)

Henry Boimah Fahnbulleh, Jr. (born July 16, 1949) is a Liberian politician and diplomat. He most recently served in the Liberian Government as National Security Advisor in the Ellen Johnson Sirleaf administration. Immediately before his appointment as National Security Advisor, he served as Advisor on International Affairs in the same government. He served as Foreign Minister from 1981 to 1983 under President Samuel Doe.

Fahnbulleh's father, H. Boimah Fahnbulleh, Sr, was also prominent in Liberian society; in Fahnbulleh Jr's words, Fahnbulleh Sr was "killed while striving for socio-economic justice". In 1968, Fahnbulleh Sr was convicted of treason based on his alleged writing of letters to other countries' ambassadors asking for help in a conspiracy to overthrow the existing Liberian government. According to the prosecution, he had been plotting since 1956; a major portion of the prosecution's case consisted of alleging that Fahnbulleh had criticised the Liberian government in front of other countries' ambassadors while he was serving as the Liberian ambassador to Kenya. Fahnbulleh Sr denied the charges, stating that he deserved a new trial because the prosecution's arguments were based on events that never happened. The prosecution replied that his arguments were "unmeritorious" because the events did not need to have happened in order for him to be guilty, and his request for a new trial was denied. Very soon after taking office in 1971, President William R. Tolbert, Jr. recognised that Fahnbulleh had been the victim of trumped-up charges and pardoned him.

== Biography ==
Born in Monrovia in 1949 to H. Boima Fahnbulleh, Sr and "Ma" Mary Brownell (1929–2017), Henry Boimah Fahnbulleh was educated in Liberia, Sierra Leone, Kenya, and the United States. He graduated from Fourah Bay College in Sierra Leone, having studied politics, philosophy, and history. He gained his graduate degree in politics from Howard University in Washington, DC, and his doctorate from George Washington University in political philosophy and international politics.

He was a political science lecturer at the University of Liberia and also served as Minister of Education and of Foreign Affairs in the Samuel Doe military government from 1980 to 1983. He was a "prominent" member of the Liberian NGO Movement for Justice in Africa (MOJA) in the 1970s. It was during this period that the decision was taken to change the Liberian university calendar from the calendar year (roughly February–November) to September–July/August.

He lived in exile in Europe, spending some time in London, from 1983 to 1990 and from 1997 to the early years of the 2000s (decade). In Ghana in 1986, Fahnbulleh was creating his own opposition group to President Doe, named the Front for Popular Democracy in Liberia (FPDL), or Popular Democratic Front. Charles Taylor claimed that because he did not join the MOJA/FPDL grouping in Accra, Fahnbulleh arranged his arrest by Ghanaian security forces. The FPDL has apparently been extinct since 1990. Fahnbulleh was still in Accra in 1987.

Fahnbulleh has written and lectured extensively on Liberian politics, editing the book Voices of Protest: Liberia on the Edge 1974–1980, published by Universal Publishers in 2005.

Fahnbulleh's sister is singer and human rights activist Miatta Fahnbulleh. He is the father of British politician and economist Miatta Fahnbulleh.

Preceded by Gabriel Baccus Matthews	Foreign Minister of Liberia; 1981–83	Succeeded by Ernest Eastman
