= Benoni Urey =

Americo-Liberian businessman and politician

Benoni Wilfred Urey
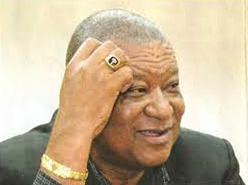
- Born: 22 June 1957 (age 69); Careysburg, Liberia
- Citizenship: Liberia
- Education: Cuttington University; University of Southern California
- Known for: Business holdings; association with Charles Taylor
- Spouse: Mai Bright Urey (m. 1986)
- Children: 4, including Telia Urey
- Parent(s): Emma Urey & Daniel Webster Urey IV

Benoni Wilfred Urey (born 22 June 1957) is an Americo-Liberian businessman and politician, who was formerly the Liberian Commissioner of Maritime Affairs. In 2014 The Economist reported that Urey was Liberia's wealthiest man.

== Early life and career ==
Urey was born on 22 June 1957 at his family home in Careysburg, Montserrado County, Liberia. His father was married to three women, his mother, Emma Boyce Urey, Martha Urey and Kpannah Urey. Two of his father's wives were Kpelle and one was Americo-Liberian. His father, Daniel Urey, was an Americo-Liberian from Careysburg. Urey’s father met two of his wives in Caresyburg and one in Bong County. Two of Urey's mothers were dominantly native women who never spoke English, while the other was a school teacher. His father was subsistence farmer. This family lived in Careysburg throughout their lives.

Benoni is the eighth of eleven children. He attended kindergarten and first grade at Careysburg Public School. With the aid of a scholarship from the U.S. government through the Voice of America relay station, Urey attended the American Cooperative School (A.C.S), a private American school in Monrovia, from first grade until his graduation from high school in 1976. While attending A.C.S, he participated in almost every varsity sport, including basketball. His love for basketball led him and some friends to form The Uhuru Kings and Queens, a social and sports club that eventually became a first division member of Liberia Basketball Federation. Uhuru Kings still is a member of the Liberian Basketball Federation and has participated in numerous national championships over the years.

After high school, Urey attended Cuttington University, in Bong County. He earned a Bachelor of Science Degree in General Science with emphasis in chemistry in 1980. At Cuttington University, Urey served as the President of The Mason Social and Athletic Club, and in his last year, President of the Senior class. Later in 2010, Urey was awarded the Doctor of Humane Letters (L.H.D.) Honoris Causa from Cuttington University.

After university, Urey moved to Monrovia and began to work for the government, at the Liberia Electricity Corporation (LEC). He worked as a Training Officer until he was awarded a scholarship to pursue a M.A. in Public Finance and Human Resource Development and a M.Sc in Planning from the University of Southern California. He graduated from USC in 1986.

Upon his return to Liberia in 1986, Benoni was appointed Deputy Director General for Planning and Training of the Liberia Electricity Corporation Training Center under the Presidency of the late President Samuel K. Doe. He worked at the corporation until the war broke out.

In 1990, when the Liberian Civil War broke out, Urey left Liberia and traveled to Sierra Leone and lived there for eight months and later moved to Ivory Coast. While there, he started to work at African Development Bank as a consultant. In 1994, Urey returned to Bong County, Liberia and started to work as the Managing Director at Liberia Rubber Development Corporation.

== Political career ==
Under the Interim Government of Liberia, chaired by Wilton Sankawulo, in 1995, Urey was appointed President of Agricultural Cooperative Development Bank of Liberia.

In 1996, the Council of State appointed Urey as Commissioner of Maritime Affairs. When Charles Taylor came to power after winning elections in 1997, Urey was reappointed to his position as Commissioner of Maritime. He served as Commissioner until 2003, when Taylor resigned from office.

In 2000, Urey was sanctioned by the United Nations for his alleged role in arms procurement (starting in summer of 2002) and also for his alleged “ongoing ties with Charles Taylor”. Urey breached an earlier UN travel ban in August 2001. His name was added to the US Treasury Department's Specially Designated Nationals list, prohibiting him from conducting business with US companies, citizens and residents, and blocking all US based assets. A 2005 report from the Coalition for International Justice reported that Urey helped Taylor "siphon off" funds from a shipping firm to pay for arms and was the primary contact between Taylor and Viktor Bout. The United Nations Panel of Experts concluded in their November 2013 report that "evidence indicates, however, that in approving the funds Urey was acting on the orders of Taylor." The Liberian Truth and Reconciliation Commission (TRC) recommended in its final report that Urey be prosecuted for the commission of economic crimes during the civil war and barred from holding public office for 30 years. During the TRC hearings, Urey was identified by witness James Paul as operating the Liberian Rubber Company and exporting "hundred of thousands of tons of rubber", the proceeds of which were never accounted for.

Urey has denied any involvement in the violence of the Liberian and Sierra Leone civil conflicts, maintaining that as a civilian being appointed to head the Maritime Commission, he made no war-related decisions. An investigation by the United Nations Panel of Experts on Liberia's political situation in 2013 concluded that it “did not have information suggesting that Urey was involved in activities that would destabilize Liberia and the subregion”. The Panel also stated that “Urey’s business activities, and the profits gained from them, would appear to suggest that civil conflict in Liberia would have a significant negative financial impact on him”. In December 2013, Urey was de-listed from the United Nations Sanction Lists. In November 2015, the US Treasury Department lifted sanctions against a number of Liberians, including Urey. But a Liberian newspaper reported that Urey was subsequently denied a US entry visa in 2016, a claim which was denied by the All Liberian Party.

In 2009, Urey was elected Mayor of Careysburg City by the City Council. President Ellen Johnson Sirleaf endorsed the appointment by subsequently appointing him Mayor. He served as Mayor until 2012. President Sirleaf relieved Urey of this post when it became evident that he would not support her re-election bid in 2011, instead, supporting the Congress for Democratic Change.

== Business career ==
=== Lonestar Cell ===
Urey currently owns Lonestar Communication Corporation, Liberia's largest mobile phone service provider which is partnered with the MTN Group, through his PLC Investments group. Lonestar is one of the largest taxpayers in Liberia. Urey has served as the Chairman of the Board since the establishment of the corporation.

=== Wulki Farms I & II ===
Urey established an agricultural farm and resort in Careysburg City, Wulki Farms I and Farmers Paradise Resort, developed on land owned by his father, Daniel Webster Urey IV. Benoni’s wife, Mai Urey, is the Managing Director of Wulki Farms and Farmers Paradise. The property includes commercial production of poultry and eggs, fish and fresh produce and guest accommodation.

Urey owns the sixth largest rubber plantation, Wulki Farms II, located in Konola, Margibi County.

=== Love Media Incorporated ===
Owned solely by Urey, Love Media Incorporated was established in 2003 and comprises radio and television stations and a newspaper. These stations are based in Monrovia and Careysburg City. Shiata FM, another station owned by Urey, was established in 2005 and is based in Careysburg City. During the 2011 election campaign, Love Radio and TV stations were set on fire. Urey accused the Government of being involved in the burning of his stations because he was a financial supporter of the opposition party, Congress for Democratic Change.

=== U-Housing Incorporated ===
U-Housing is a real estate development company owned by Urey. He began developing real estate in 1994 when he returned to Liberia. U-Housing has acquired and developed a wide range of commercial and residential properties throughout the country.

== 2017 Presidential Elections ==
In December 2013, Urey declared his desire to run for the Presidency of Liberia in 2017, with initial speculation in Liberian media that he would do so with the Congress for Democratic Change party headed by former footballer George Weah. Urey subsequently launched the All Liberian Party in November 2015 at the Antoinette Tubman Stadium in Monrovia.

== Personal life ==
Urey married Mai Bright Urey on 26 May 1986. They have four daughters: Danielle Ashlee Urey, Telia Urey, Jebbeh Naomi Urey and Benita Whitney Urey. He is a Christian. He was born and raised as a Presbyterian and serves as the sexton at the First Presbyterian Church of Careysburg. Urey is fluent in English and his native language, Kpelle. Urey also serves as “Deputy District Grand Master” of the Grand Lodge of the Republic of Liberia, and Honorable Grand Patron of the Prince Hall Order of the Eastern Star of Liberia.
