= MacDella Cooper =

Liberian politician

- Born: March 13, 1977 (age 49); Monrovia, Liberia
- Education: The College of New Jersey
- Occupation: Politician
- Known for: Presidential candidate Founder of Movement for One Liberia (MOL); Founder of MacDella Cooper Foundation; Founder of MacDella Cooper Academy
- Political party: Movement for One Liberia (MOL)
- Children: 3
- Website: www.macdellacooper.org

MacDella Cooper (born March 13, 1977) is a Liberian politician and philanthropist. She is the Political Leader of The Movement for One Liberia (MOL) political party.

Born in Monrovia, MacDella Cooper was exiled to Ivory Coast during the outbreak of the First Liberian Civil War before being reunited with her family in the United States.

She graduated from Barringer High School in Newark, New Jersey, where she was one of the top-ranked students in her class, and subsequently earned a full academic scholarship to The College of New Jersey, where she earned a degree in Electronic Communications.

Cooper worked as an international businesswoman for several years before founding the MacDella Cooper Foundation, the MacDella Cooper Academy, and the Movement for One Liberia political party.

In October 2016, Cooper announced her intention to run for the Presidency of Liberia in the 2017 Liberian National Elections.

== Early life and education ==
Cooper was born in Liberia's capital, Monrovia, and lived there until the outbreak of the First Liberian Civil War. The war forced Cooper into exile in neighboring Ivory Coast, where she spent her early teenage years as a refugee until 1993, when she was reunited with her family in the United States.

She attended Barringer High School in Newark, New Jersey, where she ranked third in her class of 1,200 students. She was awarded a full academic scholarship to The College of New Jersey in Ewing, New Jersey, where she subsequently earned a degree in Electronic Communications.

== Business career ==
Cooper began her professional career in fashion marketing and public relations and later branched out into corporate planning, consulting for global organizations like Citi Group, Duca Sartoria and Starwood, among others.

Cooper has held several leadership, advisory and board positions in the United States, Liberia, and other countries, including representation with humanitarian organizations.

== MacDella Cooper Foundation (MCF) ==
In 2003, Cooper founded the MacDella Cooper Foundation, a 501c3 international charitable organization whose mission is to educate, train and motivate Africa's most vulnerable children, disadvantaged youth and marginalized women, helping them to become productive contributors to their nations’ economic, social and political development.

The foundation provided the fundamental building block for raising millions of dollars to support national development projects in Liberia. Cooper used her philanthropic platform to advocate for the necessary funds to promote human rights, as well as the protection of women and children. The foundation also provides access to education, healthcare, affordable housing and employment.

== MacDella Cooper Foundation Academy ==
In December 2010, the MacDella Cooper Foundation opened the first school in Liberia to offer free tuition that includes room and board. Located in Charlesville, Margibi County, Liberia, the MacDella Cooper Foundation Academy has the capacity to house 80 students, aged 4 to 13 years. The school's building was designed by award-winning Dutch-American architect Winka Dubbeldam.

The Academy provides quality education and life skills for "at-risk", vulnerable, and disadvantaged children in an environment that is conducive to learning. At the MCF Academy, students get three meals a day consisting of healthy, locally grown ingredients.

The foundation's former participants are now internationally recognized performers who have been invited to various events including the official Africa Day celebrations in Paris and the UN Peace Concert in the United States.

Additionally, all eligible children from the MCF Academy successfully wrote and passed their West African Examination Council (WAEC) exams, a regional requirement for recognition within West Africa.

The MCF Academy successfully replaced a severely damaged roof after its collapse, ensuring that children are safe and secure within their classrooms. The Foundation has also constructed a 12th grade classroom in honor of the Segal Family.

== Movement for One Liberia (MOL) Political Party ==
MacDella Cooper is the current Political Leader for the Movement for One Liberia (MOL), the political party that was founded in 2019 and accredited in 2020. The Movement for One Liberia provides women, youth, and people living with disabilities the opportunity to participate in public office.

The party's mission is to provide democratic rights and civil liberties to every Liberian, especially the under-represented - women, youth, disabled, and those with dissimilar orientation.

== Political career ==
On October 17, 2016, MacDella Cooper publicly announced her candidacy for President of Liberia in the 2017 elections. She was also The Movement for One Liberia's candidate for the Montserrado County Senatorial elections held on July 2, 2020.

In 2022, MacDella Cooper announced her intention to run for President in the 2023 Liberian Presidential election, once again making her the only female candidate competing for Liberia's highest office. Cooper's quest for the Presidency gained popularity and she appeared as a guest on several notable radio and television broadcast stations in Liberia. On May 26, 2023, Cooper publicly endorsed former Vice President Joseph Boakai's bid for the Presidency, citing a desire to consolidate efforts to bring unity to Liberians. The announcement was made from the Movement for One Liberia's headquarters in Monrovia, where Cooper still serves as the party's political leader.

== Personal life ==
MacDella Cooper lives in Monrovia, Liberia with her husband and three children.
