= Alexander B. Cummings Jr. =

Liberian politician

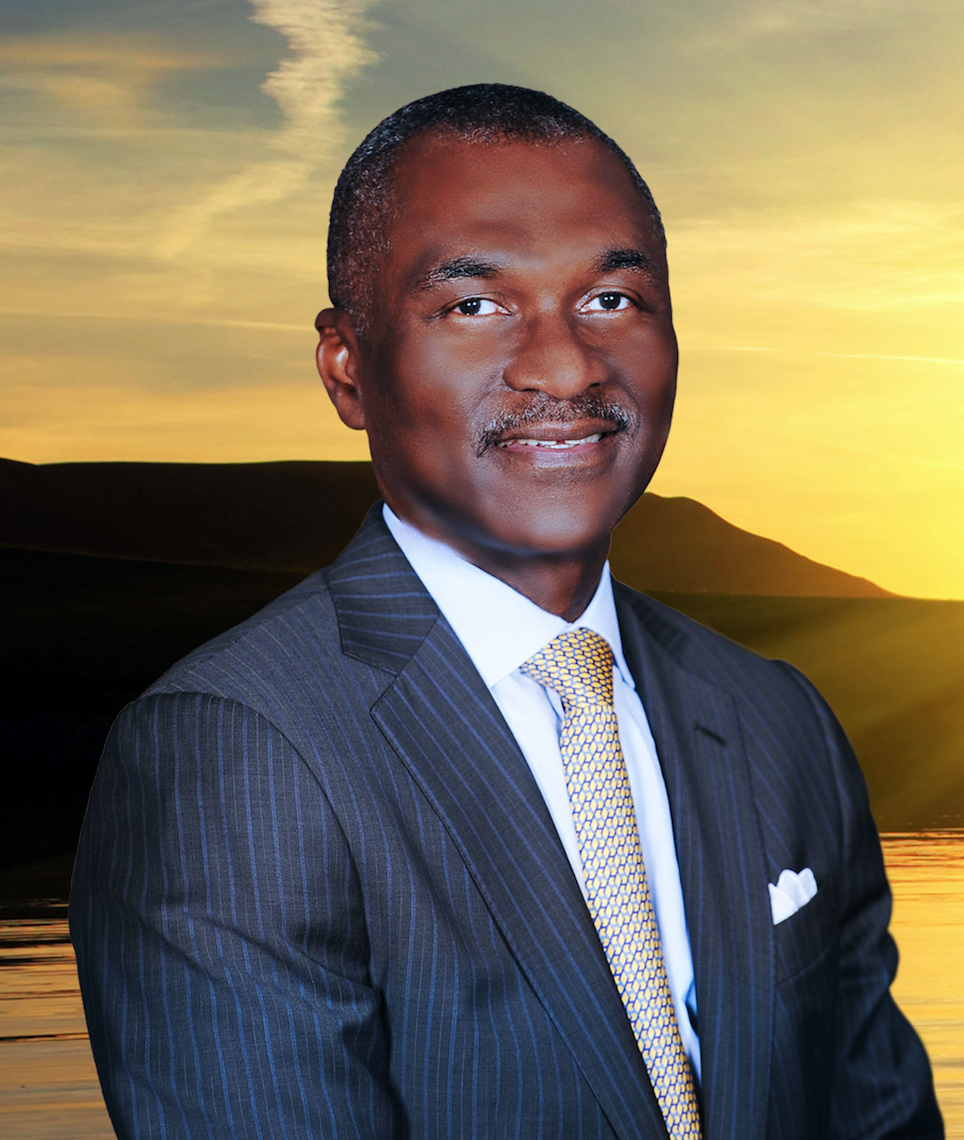
- Cummings in July 2017

Standard Bearer of the ANC Liberia
- Incumbent
- Assumed office 2017

Personal details
- Born: 7 December 1956 (age 69) Monrovia, Liberia
- Party: ANC
- Spouse: Teresa Cummings
- Children: 2: Ayo; Boikai
- Education: Cuttington University (BA); Clark-Atlanta University (MBA)
- Occupation: Businessman
- Profession: Financial analyst
- Facebook: votecummings
- Twitter: vote_cummings
- Instagram: votecummings
- Website: alexanderbcummings.com
- Nickname(s): Talk and Do, ABC.

Alexander Benedict Cummings Jr. (born 7 December 1956) is a Liberian politician, businessman and philanthropist. He is the Standard Bearer of Liberia's Alternative National Congress.

Born in Monrovia Liberia, Cummings studied at Cuttington University College in Liberia before leaving for the United States to further his studies at the Northern Illinois University, where he earned a Bachelor of Science degree in Finance and Economics. He earned an MBA in Finance from Clark-Atlanta University.

Cummings worked for over 40 years in international business. He retired from Coca-Cola as its Chief Administrator in 2016, after a twenty years long career with the organisation.

He currently serves as Chairman of the Cummings Africa Foundation.

== Early life and education ==
Alexander B. Cummings Jr. was born in Montserrado County in Liberia's capital Monrovia to Alexander B. Cummings Sr., an educator, and Ayo, a midwife and small business owner. He spent his early years in Monrovia's deprived Point Four neighbourhood before studying at a Monrovia's Demonstration primary school in Montserrado County. His first introduction to business was by his mother, who leveraged him to go door-to-door to collect payment from customers and keep track of sales.

He attended high school at the College of West Africa, where he participated in various social and intellectual activities and served yearly as a class officer including first as class senator, then treasurer and eventually senior class president. After graduation from high school, he matriculated to Cuttington University College for two years before leaving for the United States to further his studies at the Northern Illinois University, where he earned a Bachelor of Science degree in Finance and Economics. He returned to the United States to further his studies and earned an MBA in Finance from Clark-Atlanta University.

== Business career ==
Upon graduation from Northern Illinois University he returned home and worked for two years at the Liberian Development Bank, until the tail-end of the 1980s. In the 1970s, Cummings returned to the US to attend Atlanta University where he received his MBA in Finance. He began his international business career, which took him to the Nigeria, Kenya, Morocco, UK and South Africa. Cummings began working for The Pillsbury Company in 1982, his last position being Vice-President of Finance for all of Pillsbury's international businesses.

Cummings joined Coca-Cola Co. in 1997 as Deputy Region Manager, Nigeria based in Lagos, Nigeria and managing director/Region Manager, Nigeria in 1998. He became President of Coca-Cola's Africa Group in 2001. He served as Chief Administrative Officer of the Coca-Cola Company from 1 July 2008 to 31 March 2016 and as its Executive Vice-President from July 2002 to 31 March 2016. As Chief Administrative Officer, he consolidated oversight of key global corporate functions including Legal, People, Strategic Planning, Information Technology, Strategic Security, Sustainability and Technical. Cummings led a period of strong growth in Coca-Cola's Africa business, overseeing critical investments in marketing and infrastructure across 56 African countries and territories from 2001 to 2008.

Mr. Cummings served on the boards of, CARE and Clark Atlanta University. He also is a board member of S.C. Johnson & Son, Inc. and a former board member of The Coca-Cola Bottling Co. Consolidated, a publicly traded bottler of The Coca-Cola Company (NASDAQ). He is a member of their Executive Leadership Council.

He previously served as a Board Member of the Africa-America Institute, Chevron, Africare, the Corporate Council on Africa, and the US-Egypt Business Council, on the Advisory Board at The African Presidential Archives & Research Center and on the Center for Global Development's Commission on US Policy toward Low-Income Poorly Performing States (LIPPS), Sabathani Community Center in Minneapolis, MN, USA

He also served as an Independent Director of Chevron Corporation from 10 December 2014 until 27 April 2016, and as a Director of International Bank (Liberia) Limited. He previously served as a Board Member of the Africa-America Institute, Chevron, Africare, the Corporate Council on Africa, and the US-Egypt Business Council, on the Advisory Board at The African Presidential Archives & Research Center and on the Center for Global Development's Commission on US Policy toward Low-Income Poorly Performing States (LIPPS), Sabathani Community Center in Minneapolis, MN, USA He previously served as a Board Member of the Africa-America Institute, Chevron, Africare, the Corporate Council on Africa, and the US-Egypt Business Council, on the Advisory Board at The African Presidential Archives & Research Center and on the Center for Global Development's Commission on US Policy toward Low-Income Poorly Performing States (LIPPS), Sabathani Community Center in Minneapolis, MN, USA He previously served as a Board Member of the Africa-America Institute, Chevron, Africare, the Corporate Council on Africa, and the US-Egypt Business Council, on the Advisory Board at The African Presidential Archives & Research Center and on the Center for Global Development's Commission on US Policy toward Low-Income Poorly Performing States (LIPPS), Sabathani Community Center in Minneapolis, MN, USA

== Political career ==
As the standard bearer of the Alternative National Congress (ANC), Cummings became the political leader of the Alternative National Congress in 2015, and announced his bid to run for president in 2016. After holding a county-by-county national presidential primary election, the first of its kind in Liberia, Alexander B. Cummings was endorsed as the Standard Bearer of the Alternative National Congress in Kakata, Margibi on 29 April 2017. In 2023, he is running for president in the Liberian 2023 General election with Charlyne Brumskine as his running mate.

== Philanthropy ==
Cummings has a long history of philanthropy and supporting his home country Liberia, globally; supporting funding for water projects and providing students scholarships in Liberia, and donating to various causes including the African Methodist Episcopal University's Innovation Center named in his honor.

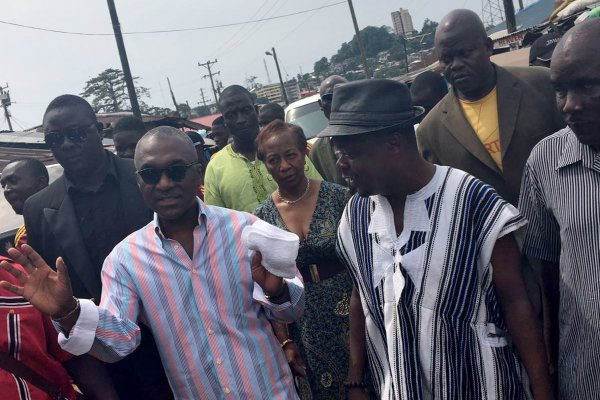
Presidential candidate Alex B. Cummings, mingles with the crowd as he tours West Point neighbourhood with his wife Teresa. West Point was a hotbed for Ebola during the crisis.

In 2011, President Ellen Johnson Sirleaf conferred on Mr. Cummings the distinction of Knight Great Band – Humane Order of African Redemption; the medal is one of the highest honors in Liberia and is awarded for humanitarian work in Liberia, for acts supporting and assisting the Liberian nation.

During Cummings' time at Coca-Cola Africa, he oversaw the creation of The Coca-Cola Africa Foundation in response to the growth and impact of the HIV/AIDS pandemic. In 2001, the Foundation established an extensive healthcare program for Coca-Cola workers affected by HIV/AIDS and related conditions across Africa in addition to supporting HIV/AIDS prevention and awareness throughout local communities. Today, The Coca-Cola Africa Foundation is the largest regional foundation within Coca-Cola's global network with a focus on clean water, health education and entrepreneurship. Since 2001, it has granted more than $100 million (~$169 million in 2024) to support sustainable communities in Africa.

He launched the Cummings Africa Foundation in 2015 with his wife Teresa Cummings, and their two children Boikai and Ayo Cummings. The Cummings Foundation focuses on empowering and uplifting Africans in health, education, agriculture, and the arts. Since its formation, the foundation has invested over one million U.S. dollars in projects in Africa, including facilitating the construction of a STEM (Science, Technology, Engineering and Mathematics) academic institution, the first of its kind in Liberia.

== Personal life ==
Cummings has been married to Teresa Cummings for over 35 years. Together they have two children – Ayo and Boikai Cummings and five grandchildren.
