= National Elections Commission (Liberia) =

Autonomous Liberia Agency

National Elections Commission of the Republic of Liberia
- NEC

Agency overview
- Formed: 1986
- Jurisdiction: Liberia
- Headquarters: Monrovia, Liberia
- Agency executive: Jerome George Korkoya, Chairman
- Website: www.necliberia.org

The National Elections Commission (NEC) of the Republic of Liberia is an autonomous agency in Liberia that supervises the national elections of Liberia.

== Staff ==
The following people are members of the Commission of 2023

- Chairman: Davidetta Browne Lansanah
- Co-Chairman: P. Teplah Reeves
- Commissioners:
  - Boakai Dukuly
  - Josephine Kou Gaye
  - Barsee Leo Kpangbai
  - Ernestine Morgan-Awar (ESQ.)
  - Floyd Oxley Sayor
- Executive-Director
- Deputy Executive-Directors

== International aid ==
In 2009, a $17.5 million contract was offered to the NEC by USAID through the International Foundation for Electoral Systems. The money was provided to support the Commission in holding the 2011 and 2014 general elections. The aid was greeted by then election commissioner, James Fromayan.
