= Government ministries of Liberia =

Ministry Of State for Presidential Affairs

Government ministries of the Republic of Liberia enact the will of the Government of Liberia. They include:

- Ministry of Agriculture, Liberia
- Ministry of Commerce and Industry, Liberia
- Ministry of Education, Liberia
- Ministry of Finance and Development Planning (Liberia)
- Ministry of Foreign Affairs, Liberia
- Ministry of Gender, Children and Social Protection, and Development, Liberia
- Ministry of Health and Social Welfare, Liberia
- Ministry of Information, Liberia
- Ministry of Local Government
- Ministry of Justice, Liberia
- Ministry of Labor, Liberia
- Ministry of Mines and Energy
- Ministry of National Defense, Liberia
- Ministry of Post and Telecommunications, Liberia
- Ministry of Public Works, Liberia
- Ministry of State for Presidential Affairs, Liberia
- Ministry of Transport: responsible for regulating transportation by land, rail, water and air. Its functions include motor vehicle registration, driver licensing, road safety and the regulation of public transportation. The ministry is headquartered in Monrovia.
- Ministry of Youth and Sports, Liberia

== See also ==
- Government of Liberia
- Cabinet of Liberia
