= Cabinet of Liberia =

National Cabinet of Liberia

The Cabinet of Liberia, together with the President and Vice President, form the executive branch of government in the country. The President, with the consent of the Senate, appoints cabinet ministers.

== The current government ==
The following is a list of ministers currently serving in the administration of President Joseph Nyuma Boakai, who took office as president on 22 January 2024:

Office	Minister
Minister of Foreign Affairs	Sara Beysolow Nyanti
Minister of Finance	Augustine Kpehe Ngafuan
Minister of Justice and Attorney-General	N. Oswald Tweh
Minister of Posts and Telecommunications	Sekou M. Kromah
Minister of National Defense	Brigadier General Geraldine J. George
Minister of Internal Affairs	Francis Sakila Nyumalin
Minister of Education	Jarso Maley Jallah
Minister of Public Works	Roland Lafayette Giddings
Minister of Agriculture	Dr. J. Alexander Nuetah
Minister of Health and Social Welfare	Dr. Louise M. Kpoto
Minister of Commerce and Industry	Magdalene Dagoseh
Minister of Information, Culture, and Tourism	Jerolinmek Piah
Minister of Lands, Mines, and Energy	R. Matenokay Tingban
Minister of Labor	Cllr. Cooper Kruah
Minister of Youth and Sport	Cornelia Kruah
Minister of Transport	Sirleaf Ralph Tyler
Minister of Gender, Children and Social Protection	Gbeme Horace Kollie
Minister of State for Presidential Affairs	Samuel Stevquoah
Minister of State without Portfolio	Mamaka Bility
Minister of State without Portfolio/Special Services	

== See also ==
- Liberian elections, 2005
- Government ministries of Liberia
