= Chief of Staff of the Armed Forces (Liberia) =

Head of the armed forces of Liberia

- Incumbent; Davidson F. Forleh since 31 January 2025
- Armed Forces of Liberia
- Type: Chief of staff
- Abbreviation: COS – AFL
- Appointer: The president with Senate advice and consent
- Term length: At the pleasure of the president
- Formation: 1909
- First holder: Major R. Mackay Cadell
- Deputy: Vice Chief of Staff
- Website: Official website

The chief of staff is the professional head of the Armed Forces of the Republic of Liberia. The chief of staff is appointed by the president of Liberia, who is the commander-in-chief of the Armed Forces according to the Constitution.

== List of officeholders ==
=== Liberia Frontier Force ===
No.	Portrait	Name (born–died)	Term of office			Ref.
No.	Portrait	Name (born–died)	Took office	Left office	Time in office	Ref.
?	Alexander Harper	Major General; Alexander Harper	1952	1954	1–2 years	–
?	Abraham Jackson	Lieutenant General; Abraham Jackson	1954	1956	1–2 years	

=== Armed Forces of Liberia ===
Portrait	Name (born–died)	Term of office			Ref.
Portrait	Name (born–died)	Took office	Left office	Time in office	Ref.
Chief of staff
	Lieutenant General; Abraham Jackson	1956	1960	3–4 years	
	Lieutenant General; George T. Washington (born 1928)	1965	1970	4–5 years	
	Lieutenant General; Henry Korboi Johnson	1970	September 1979	8–9 years	
	Franklin J. Smith	September 1979	1980		
	Brigadier General; Edwin Lloyd	?	May 1980	?	
Commanding general
	Brigadier General; Thomas Quiwonkpa (1955–1985)	May 1980	1983	2–3 years	
	Lieutenant General; Henry Dubar	1983	30 June 1990	9–10 years	
	Lieutenant General; Charles Julue	30 June 1990	5 July 1990	5 days	
	Lieutenant General; Hezekiah Bowen (1943–2010)	1990	1997(?)	6–7 years	
Chief of staff
	Lieutenant General; Prince C. Johnson II (?–1999)	August 1997	November 1999 †	2 years, 5 months	
	Lieutenant General; Kpengbai Y. Konah	25 November 1999	February 2006	6 years, 3 months	
Command officer-in-charge
	Major General; Luka Yusuf (1952–2009)	February 2006	May 2007	1 year, 119 days	
	Major General; Suraj Abdurrahman (1954–2015)	6 June 2007	11 February 2014	6 years, 250 days	
Chief of staff
	Major General; Daniel Dee Ziankhan (born 1971)	11 February 2014	5 February 2018	3 years, 360 days	
	Major General; Prince C. Johnson III (born 1976)	5 February 2018	5 February 2024	6 years	
	Brigadier General; Davidson Fayiah Forleh	25 March 2024	Incumbent	2 years, 166 days	

== Deputy chiefs of staff ==
- Colonel Daniel Moore (-11 February 2013)
- Colonel Eric Wayma Dennis (11 February 2013-8 August 2016)
- Brigadier General Prince C. Johnson III (14 November 2016-6 February 2018)
- Brigadier General Geraldine George (6 February 2018-12 February 2024)
