= Sirleaf =

Sirleaf is a surname. Notable people with the surname include:

- Akeem Sirleaf (born 1997), Liberian athlete
- Ellen Johnson Sirleaf (born 1938), former President of Liberia, from 2006 to 2018
  - Fombah Sirleaf, her stepson and sometime director of the Liberian National Security Agency
- Retta Sirleaf (born 1970), American stand-up comedian and actress
- Momolu Sirleaf, Liberian foreign minister
