= Sara Beysolow Nyanti =

Former UN officeholder from Liberia

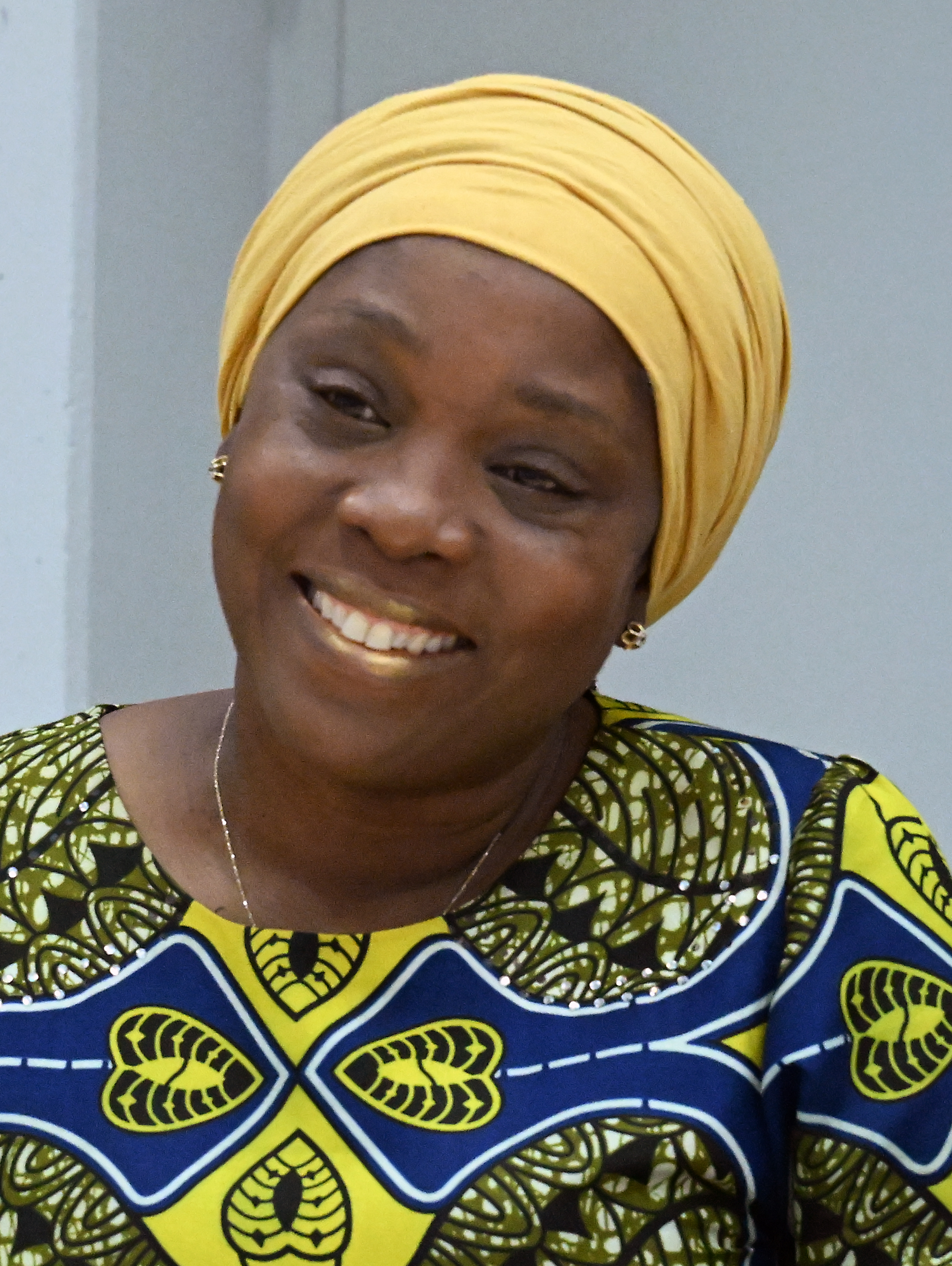
- Nyanti in 2024

United Nations Assistant Secretary General
- In office December 2021 – July 2023

Personal details
- Born: Sara Frances Beysolow; 1968 (age 57–58) Liberia
- Spouse: Stephen Joeboe Nyanti
- Education: College of West Africa, Cuttington University, New Charter University

Sara Frances Beysolow Nyanti (born 1968) is an international development expert, Liberian pastor and since February 2024 the Foreign Minister of Liberia. She has more than 20 years of professional experience. She was the United Nations Assistant Secretary General from December 2021 to her retirement in July 2023.

== Early life and education ==
Nyanti is the oldest of seven children of Winston E. Beysolow and Frances Hayes. Her mother worked multiple jobs to support her children. She attended the College of West Africa and Cuttington University. She has a master's degree in public administration from the New Charter University in the United States and is completing a doctoral degree in transformational leadership.

== Career ==
Nyanti held senior positions in the Liberian Ministry of Health from 1999 to 2003, including as Director of the National AIDS Control Program. She wrote the country's first grant to the Global Fund for money to combat malaria, HIV, and tuberculosis. During the conflict and transitional government periods, Nyanti worked for the United Nations in Liberia.

From 2005 to 2009, Nyanti worked for the UN in Nepal, before becoming UNICEF HIV/AIDS advisor to the representatives in Namibia and Kenya in 2009. She was head of the UNICEF office in Lagos from 2015 to 2015. She was UNICEF Representative in Gambia from 2015 to 2017 and in Yemen from 2019 to 2020. In January 2021, she was appointed Resident Coordinator for the UN in Nepal.

Nyanti was a key figure in the response to Nigeria's Ebola Virus Disease outbreak and has been a leader in the international response to the COVID-19 pandemic. Since 2019, she has been the highest ranking Liberian in the UN.

In November 2021, she moderated the second day of the Women Political Leaders' fourth annual Reykjavik Global Forum, noting the need for gender equality to move from policy to action.

In December 2021, UN Secretary-General António Guterres appointed Nyanti Deputy Special Representative, Resident Coordinator and Humanitarian Coordinator in South Sudan (UNMISS) and Resident Coordinator in South Sudan, succeeding Alain Noudéhou of Benin. The role is an Assistant Secretary General. Nyanti will be leading the UN's efforts in recovery and stabilization in the world's newest country.

She was appointed the Minister of Foreign Affairs and Dean of the Cabinet in February 2024.

== Community service and activism ==
Nyanti is an ordained Reverend and a minister at the Zion Grove Baptist Church in Brewerville, outside Monrovia. In October 2020, she preached at the Liberia Baptist Missionary and Educational Convention and expressed her disappointment over the "conspicuous silence of denominations of various churches to stand up and speak against societal ills in Liberia. She has spoken out and written about sexual violence in Liberia.

In 2014, Nyanti founded an NGO, The Development Brokers, which operates the Social Movement for Change (SM4C) to change impoverished communities in Montserrado County. She has launched two Rainbow Community Learning Huts for adolescent girls in response to escalating rape cases, each accommodating 30 girls who are assisted with education and counselling.

In January 2021, Nyanti was appointed to the Board of the Center for Transparency and Accountability in Liberia (CENTAL), the national chapter of Transparency International.

In the 2023 election, Nyanti ran for the presidency of Liberia with the African Liberation League party.

== Personal life ==
Nyanti is married to Stephen Joeboe Nyanti, and has children and grandchildren. She is a feminist and on her appointment with the UN in Nepal, named the many Liberian women who had inspired her.

== Selected publications ==
- Shuaib, Faisal; Gunnala, Rajni; Musa, Emmanuel O.; Mahoney, Frank J.; Oguntimehin, Olukayode; Nguku, Patrick M.; Nyanti, Sara Beysolow (2014). "Ebola virus disease outbreak—Nigeria, July–September 2014". MMWR. Morbidity and Mortality Weekly Report. 63 (39): 867–872. PMC 4584877. PMID 25275332.
- Maduka, Omosivie; Nzuki, Charles; Ozoh, Hilary Chidi; Tweneboa-Kodua, Arthur; Nyanti, Sara Beysolow; Akosile, Caroline Fola; Oyewoga, Disu; Haastrup, Adenrele; Shuaib, Faisal (2017). "House-to-house interpersonal communication in the containment of Ebola in Nigeria". Journal of Communication in Healthcare. 10 (1): 31–36. doi:10.1080/17538068.2017.1304013. S2CID 78265029.
- Nyanti, Sara (2018). "Dealing with Ethical Dilemmas:A Partnership Broker's Personal Perspective". In Leda Stott (ed.). Shaping Sustainable Change: The Role of Partnership Brokering in Optimising Collaborative Action. Vol. 63. Routledge. pp. 867–872. ISBN 9780429822889. PMC 4584877. PMID 25275332.
