= Prince C. Johnson III =

Liberian military officer

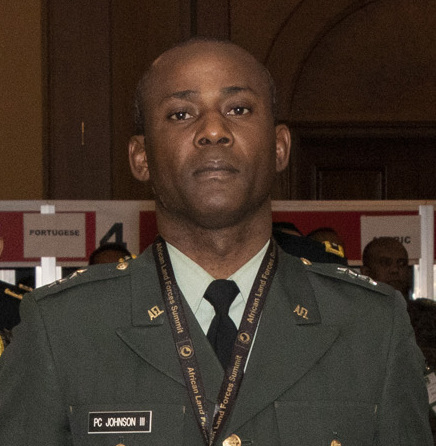

Minister of National Defense
- In office 9 February 2024 – 12 February 2024
- President: Joseph Boakai
- Preceded by: Daniel Ziankahn
- Succeeded by: Geraldine George

Chief of Staff of the Armed Forces
- In office 5 February 2018 – 5 February 2024
- President: George Weah; Joseph Boakai
- Preceded by: Daniel Ziankahn
- Succeeded by: Davidson Forleh

Personal details
- Born: 12 July 1976 (age 50) Monrovia, Liberia
- Education: United Methodist University; U.S. Army Command and General Staff College
- Profession: Soldier

Military service
- Allegiance: Liberia
- Branch/service: Armed Forces of Liberia
- Years of service: 2007–2024
- Rank: Major general
- Commands: Armed Forces of Liberia; 23rd Infantry Brigade

Major General Prince Charles Johnson III (born 12 July 1976) is a retired Liberian military officer who served as the Chief of Staff of the Armed Forces from 5 February 2018 to 5 February 2024.

== Early life and education ==
Johnson was born on July 12, 1976, in Monrovia. Johnson hails from a Mano family. Johnson's father, Lt. Gen. Prince C. Johnson II had served as Chief of Staff of the EMG Division of the National Patriotic Front of Liberia during the Civil War and as Commanding General of the AFL during the presidency of Charles Taylor.

Johnson obtained a bachelor's degree in Accounting at the United Methodist University in 2004. He received a postgraduate certificate from the University of Sierra Leone in public sector management in 2010, and graduated from the United States Army Command and General Staff College in 2012. Johnson also completed officer courses in Sierra Leone, China, and Nigeria.

== Military career ==
Johnson completed the Officer Candidate School in 2007, after which he was commissioned as 2nd Lieutenant. In the AFL he subsequently served as a number of positions, including Chief of Operations at the AFL HQ. He served as Military Assistant (MA) to the Minister of National Defense, Brownie J. Samukai Jr..

On February 11, 2014 President Ellen Johnson Sirleaf promoted Johnson as Brigade Commander of the 23rd Infantry Brigade, becoming the first Liberian to hold the post of Brigade Commander in the AFL following the end of the Liberian Civil War. As Brigade Commander, Johnson was third in command of the AFL.

On December 9, 2016 President Ellen Johnson Sirleaf promoted Johnson to Deputy Chief of Staff of the AFL with the rank of Brigadier General, following the death of the incumbent Deputy Chief of Staff Colonel Eric Dennis.

In 2018, President George Weah appointed Johnson as the new Chief of Staff of the AFL, with the promotion to the rank of Major General. The Senate of Liberia confirmed Johnson as new Chief of Staff on February 6, 2018.

== Defense minister ==
In early February 2024 Johnson retired from the AFL and was nominated as the Minister of Defense by the President Joseph Boakai, he resigned from his post just a week after confirmation by the Liberian senate due to 3-day protest actions by wives of military officers accusing him of corruption.
