= 2014 National Security Agency illegal seizure =

A political scandal in Liberia developed in 2014 after the arrest of a group of South Korean businessmen and seizure of US$247,500 from them by the National Security Agency, a national level internal security agency of Liberia.

The Minister of Justice and Attorney General at time of the incident resigned and accused the President of Liberia Ellen Johnson Sirleaf of interference in an investigation of the Liberian NSA. The head of the NSA is Fombah Sirleaf, Sirleaf's stepson, raising concerns about family ties impairing the investigation.

A special committee appointed to investigate the incident concluded that the Korean businessmen were not engaged in illegal activity. The investigation further found that the seizure was a criminal conspiracy by NSA operatives and co-conspirators outside of the agency who had lured the Korean businessmen to Liberia, and recommended prosecution of all perpetrators.

== Background ==
A group of five Korean businessmen had arranged the purchase of gold bars through emails with Nasser Aly, whom they believed to be a Lebanese gold dealer with mining interests in Liberia. Under the deal negotiated by Kim Aleck, one of the Korean businessmen, the counter parties agreed to the sale of 16 kilograms (35 lb)s of gold at the price of US$568,000. Half of the purchase price amounting to US$284,000 was to be paid upfront in Liberia.

Throughout 2014 an Ebola virus epidemic ravaged every district of Liberia. The first cases of the virus were reported in Liberia in March 2014, morphing into the most widespread Ebola epidemic in history, causing a higher loss of life in Liberia than any other country affected by the outbreak. By October 2017, the Liberian Ambassador in Washington D.C. was reported as saying that he feared that his country may be "close to collapse", but by the next month a slow down in the number of new Ebola cases resulted in the end of the state of emergency that had been declared in August.

== Arrest and seizure ==
On July 8, 2014, at around 13:30, National Security Agency operatives carried out a raid at the City King Hotel in Monrovia without a warrant. Five NSA operatives burst into a hotel room where the Korean businessmen and Aly had been holding a discussion for a few minutes. Cash in the amount of US$247,500 and other possessions including a gas dish, melting dish, two packs of gold testing chemicals, an electronic gold scale, and two pocket wallets containing money and credit cards were seized by the NSA. Earlier on the day of the raid, at 11:00 am, the Korean businessmen had withdrawn the same amount of money seized from the Sinkor, Old Road branch of the International Bank of Liberia and then gone directly to the City King Hotel, expecting to complete the transaction with Aly.

The Korean businessmen were arrested by the operatives and taken from the hotel to the headquarters of the NSA. In a lawsuit filed in 2015 against the Government of Liberia, the Korean businessmen alleged that while in custody at NSA headquarters, they were stripped naked and "subjected to various forms of humiliation and degradation without any formal charge or they being advised of their rights as required by the law". The NSA charged the Korean businessmen with counterfeiting and money laundering. A media exposé around three weeks after the incident reported that the NSA planned to deport the Korean businessmen without refunding the money. The Korean businessmen had allegedly been threatened to agree to relinquish their money in exchange for dropping of the criminal charges lodged by the NSA against them.

According to a media report, Aly was allowed by the NSA to flee Liberia after the incident.

== Investigation ==
The National Chronicle, a local daily newspaper, broke news of the seizure in a front page story on July 30, 2014. The story that appeared alleged that NSA was in cahoots with Nasser Aly in conning the Korean businessmen to come to Liberia so they could rob them of the upfront payment.

Christiana Tah, Minister of Justice and Attorney General, was notified by legal counsel for the Korean businessmen of their arrest by the NSA. She initiated an investigation by the Ministry of Justice and Liberia Anti-Corruption Commission into the incident and the charges brought against the Korean businessmen by the NSA. The Minister of Justice wrote to Fombah Sirleaf in his capacity as Director of the NSA, urging him to "forward this matter to the Ministry of Justice (MOJ) for a thorough investigation in conjunction with the NSA" and during the duration of the investigation to place the seized money in an escrow account. The same National Chronicle exposé alleged that Sirleaf was not cooperating with the Ministry of Justice investigation and was impeding it by using his family ties.

After news of the seizure became public, there was a backlash against the government for apparent abuse of power and the family ties between Fombah Sirleaf and the President of Liberia, Ellen Johnson Sirleaf. GNN Liberia, a local news publication, in a September 2017 article quoted analysts who felt the counterfeiting charge by the NSA was likely bogus because the cash seized had been withdrawn from the bank right before seizure.

A Special Independent Committee was established by President Sirleaf to investigate the incident. The committee, headed by Counselor David A.B. Jallah, then Dean and Professor of Law at the Louis Arthur Grimes School of Law, University of Liberia, produced a 3-volume, 399-page report and handed it at first to Dr. Edward McClain, then Minister of State for Presidential affairs, instead of President Sirleaf. The Jallah Commission found that the Korean businessmen had committed no crime, as had been alleged by the NSA to justify the seizure and arrest. Further, the Jallah Commission uncovered a conspiracy by the five NSA operatives directly involved, along with the gold dealer Naseer Aly and two others from outside the agency, to defraud the Korean businessmen. Among the report's recommendations, the committee called for return of the cash seized to the Korean businessmen and for the matter to be referred to the Ministry of Justice for the prosecution of all conspirators.

The Findings and Recommendations of a Special Independent Committee prepared by Jallah Commission languished for weeks before formal acceptance of receipt by President Sirleaf in December 2014.

== Resignation of Justice Minister ==
Following the incident and her attempts to investigate, Tah resigned from government positions in October 2014, alleging that President Sirleaf blocked her investigation into the National Security Agency. She offered the following remarks justifying her decision in a "Statement of Resignation":

I can no longer continue to struggle to vindicate the portfolio designated for the office of the Attorney General and Minister of Justice of the Republic of Liberia when it is eviscerated and reduced to a pretext to legitimate and perpetrate arbitrary activities and inscrutable practices under the guise of "the rule of law".

It was at the press conference to deliver her Statement of Resignation that Tah accused President Sirleaf of interfering with the investigation into the NSA seizure.

== Lawsuits ==
Shortly after the incident, three of the Korean businessmen filed a lawsuit on August 11, 2014 at Criminal Court "C" at the Temple of Justice against Fombah Sirleaf and various others in the security sector and motioned to the court for return of their money. On August 29, 2014 the motion was dismissed by the court pending the investigation by the Ministry of Justice.

A year after the Jallah Commission submitted its report including the recommendations to return the seized cash and conduct criminal prosecutions of those involved, the Government of Liberia still had not acted on the recommendations. In response to the government's inaction, the Korean businessmen filed another lawsuit against the Government of Liberia, claiming US$2.5 million in punitive damages and US$349,000 in special damages.
