= Edward McClain =

Edward McClain may refer to:

- Edward McClain (Alabama politician)
- Edward F. McClain, member of the Wisconsin State Assembly
- Edward B. McClain Jr., Liberian politician
- Boots McClain, American Negro league infielder
