= Walter Gwenigale =

Liberian politician (c.1935–2022)

Dr Walter Gwenigale
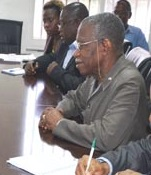

Minister of Health and Social Welfare
- In office 2006–2015
- Appointed by: Ellen Johnson Sirleaf
- Succeeded by: Bernice Dahn

Personal details
- Born: c. 1935 Central Province, Liberia (modern-day Bong County)
- Died: April 22, 2022 (aged 87) Monrovia, Liberia
- Education: Interamerican University of Puerto Rico (BA); University of Puerto Rico School of Medicine (MD)

Walter T. Gwenigale (c. 1935 – April 22, 2022) was a Liberian politician who became Minister of Health and Social Welfare in the Cabinet of Liberia in 2006. Gwenigale was born in the Central Province, which later became known as Bong County. He completed a BA in Chemistry from the Interamerican University of Puerto Rico in 1963, and a Doctor of Medicine from the University of Puerto Rico School of Medicine.

Gwenigale died on April 22, 2022, at the John F. Kennedy Medical Center.
