= COVID-19 pandemic in Liberia =

- Disease: COVID-19
- Pathogen: SARS-CoV-2
- Location: Liberia
- First outbreak: Wuhan, China
- Index case: Margibi County
- Arrival date: 16 March 2020 (6 years, 7 months, 1 week and 3 days)
- Confirmed cases: 8,090 (updated 18 September 2026)
- Deaths: 294 (updated 18 September 2026)

Government website
- https://www.facebook.com/pages/category/Government-Organization/National-Public-Health-Institute-of-Liberia-NPHIL-164280647325112/

The COVID-19 pandemic in Liberia was a part of the worldwide pandemic of coronavirus disease 2019 (COVID-19) caused by severe acute respiratory syndrome coronavirus 2 (SARS-CoV-2). The virus was confirmed to have reached Liberia in March 2020.

== Background ==
On 12 January 2020, the World Health Organization (WHO) confirmed that a novel coronavirus was the cause of a respiratory illness in a cluster of people in Wuhan City, Hubei Province, China, which was reported to the WHO on 31 December 2019.

The case fatality ratio for COVID-19 has been much lower than SARS of 2003, but the transmission has been significantly greater, with a significant total death toll.

== Timeline ==
=== March 2020 ===
- On 16 March, the first case in Liberia was confirmed, a government official who traveled from Switzerland. President George Weah controversially named the person, and claimed they violated screening protocols at Roberts International Airport (RIA) in Harbel.
- The second case was confirmed on 17 March, a close contact of the first case.
- Liberia's third case of COVID-19 was confirmed on 20 March. The third person was a returned traveler. Following this third case, the Ministry of Health and Social Welfare declared a national health emergency on 22 March.
- On 24 March, neighboring Ivory Coast announced it closed land borders with Liberia and Guinea in a measure to contain COVID-19.
- On 27 March, the U.S. Embassy evacuated some U.S. citizens from Liberia.
- At the end of the month all three cases remained active.

=== April to June 2020 ===
- Liberia reported its first death on 4 April.
- On 5 April, the German Embassy together with the European Union organized a charter flight evacuating its citizens.
- On 7 April, President George Weah appointed a new National Response Coordinator for the Executive Committee on Coronavirus. The committee will be headed by former mayor of the City of Monrovia, Madam Mary Broh. Some experts questioned Broh's ability to effectively coordinate the pandemic response given her inexperience in public health protocols. However, her appointment was noted to have been as a result of recommendations from the United Nations, particularly the World Health Organization.
- On 8 April, President George Weah declared lock-down measures to take effect on April 10 and last for 3 weeks, including suspension of all non-essential travel and curfews. Schools were closed across the country, and churches, mosques, bars, and beaches in parts of the country. The National Public Health Institute of Liberia (NPHIL) recorded a record increase in the number of confirmed cases from 14 to 31, an increase of 17 new cases. They also reported 1 more death.
- On 21 April, Liberia's legislature wrote a resolution requiring the public to wear masks in public. Enforcement of the law is unclear. As of that date, 29 confirmed cases were healthcare workers (out of 101 total confirmed cases).
- During the month there were 138 new cases, bringing the total number of confirmed cases to 141. There were 45 recoveries and 16 deaths, leaving 80 active cases at the end of the month.
- There were 147 new cases in May, bringing the total number of confirmed cases to 288. Eleven patients died, raising the total death toll to 27. The number of recovered patients rose by 112 to 157, leaving 104 active cases at the end of the month.
- On 22 June, President George Weah extended the state of emergency by 30 days.
- During the month, there were 492 new cases, raising the total number of confirmed cases to 780. The death toll rose by 9 to 36. By the end of the month 324 patients had recovered, leaving 420 active cases.

=== July to December 2020 ===
- The state of emergency was lifted on 12 July.
- There were 406 new cases in July, 118 in August, 39 in September, 83 in October, 169 in November, and 205 in December. The total number of cases stood at 1186 in July, 1304 in August, 1343 in September, 1426 in October, 1595 in November, and 1800 in December.
- The number of recovered patients stood at 670 in July, 1221 in September, 1279 in October, 1343 in November, and 1406 in December, leaving 441 active cases at the end of July, 350 at the end of August, 40 at the end of September, 65 at the end of October, 169 at the end of November, and 311 at the end of December.
- The death toll more than doubled to 75 in July and rose to 82 and 83 in August and November respectively.

=== January to December 2021 ===
- There were 4,478 confirmed cases in 2021, bringing the total number of cases to 6,278. 204 persons died, bringing the total death toll to 287.
- Modelling carried out by the Regional Office for Africa of the WHO suggests that due to under-reporting, the true number of cases by the end of 2021 was around 2.2 million while the true number of COVID-19 deaths was more than three thousand.
- Vaccination started on 1 April, initially with 96,000 doses of AstraZeneca's Covishield vaccine provided through the COVAX pillar. Two weeks into the vaccination campaign, 2735 persons had received their first inoculation.
- Liberia took delivery on 25 July of 302,400 doses of the Janssen COVID-19 vaccine donated by the United States.

=== January to December 2022 ===
- There were 1,775 confirmed cases in 2022, bringing the total number of cases to 8,053. Seven persons died, bringing the total death toll to 294.

=== January to December 2023 ===
- There were 108 confirmed cases in 2023, bringing the total number of cases to 8,161. One person died, bringing the total death toll to 295.

== Response ==
Liberia was one of the first countries to start screening passengers for COVID-19 at airports. However, initially it had just one or two functioning PCR analysis devices.

On 18 March, China donated medical supplies to Liberia.

On 13 April, the International Monetary Fund granted Liberia debt service relief, of an unknown amount.

There has been controversy in the country over whether people with infections should be named. The National Public Health Institute of Liberia's policy was to not release names of people with infections to reduce stigmatization and protect privacy, but other government officials (President George Weah, Information Minister Lenn Eugene Nagbe) have advocated for releasing names for better contact tracing.

== See also ==
- COVID-19 pandemic in Africa
- COVID-19 pandemic by country and territory
