= Suraj Abdurrahman =

Nigerian general (1954–2015)

Major general Suraj Abdurrahman CON
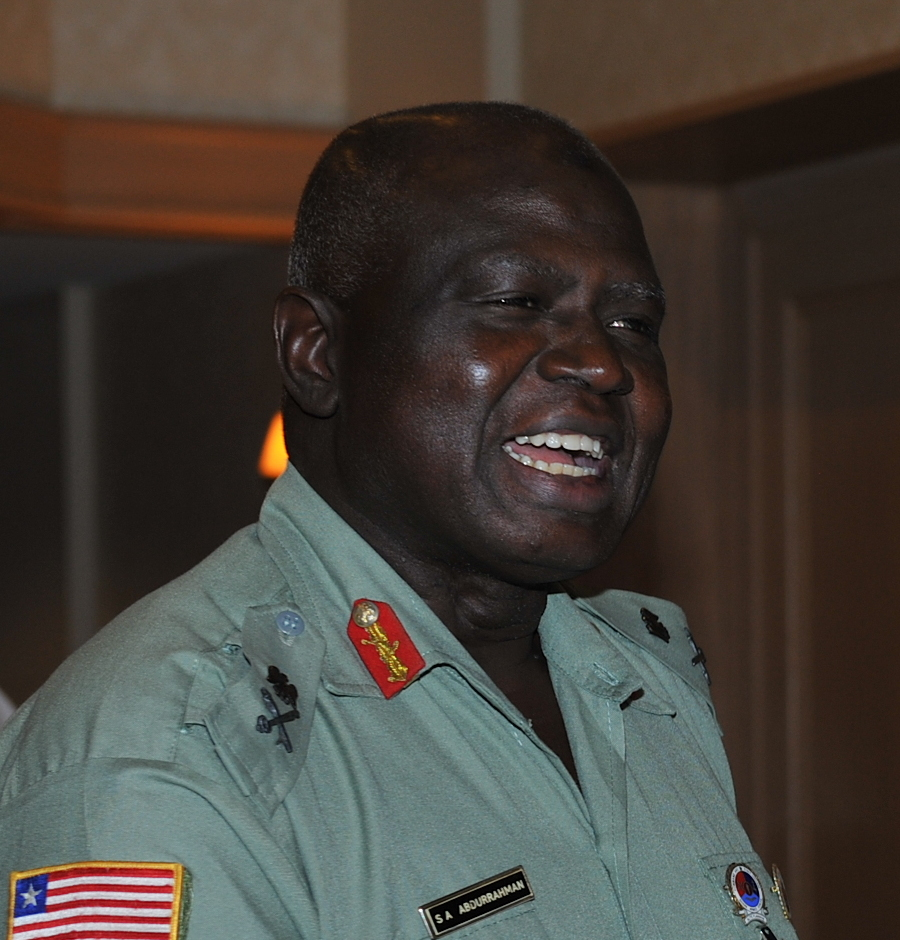

Command Officer in Charge of the Armed Forces of Liberia
- In office 6 June 2007 – 11 February 2014
- President: Ellen Johnson Sirleaf
- Preceded by: Maj-Gen. Luka Yusuf
- Succeeded by: Maj-Gen. Daniel Dee Ziankhan

Personal details
- Born: Suraj Alao Abdurrahman; 9 September 1954 Kaduna, Northern Region, British Nigeria (now in Kaduna State, Nigeria)
- Died: 28 January 2015 (aged 60) New York City, New York, U.S.
- Education: Ahmadu Bello University, Zaria; Nigerian Defence Academy, Kaduna; Armed Forces Command and Staff College, Jaji (AFCSC); National War College; Heriot-Watt University, Edinburgh

Military service
- Allegiance: Nigeria; Liberia
- Branch/service: Nigerian Army; Armed Forces of Liberia
- Rank: Major general

Suraj Alao Abdurrahman CON (9 September 1954 – 28 January 2015), was a Nigerian Army general who served as the Command Officer in Charge of the Armed Forces of Liberia, with former Liberian president Ellen Johnson Sirleaf as the Commander-in-Chief. According to then President Johnson Sirleaf, General Abdurrahman "was an exceedingly exceptional gentleman officer whose contributions lifted the Armed Forces of Liberia to professional greatness and emplace our military amongst UN peacekeepers”.

== Biography ==
Abdurrahman was born in Kaduna where he had his primary education at LEA Primary School, before proceeding to the Keffi Government College for his secondary education. He graduated with division 1 distinction in the West African Senior School Certificate Examination in 1972. He thereafter proceeded to the School of Basic Studies of the Ahmadu Bello University in Zaria until July 1973 when he was admitted into the Nigeria Defence Academy in Kaduna as a member of the 14th regular combatant course. In 1975, he was commissioned as a Second Lieutenant into the Nigeria Army Corps of Engineers. Abdurrahman held multiple commands, instructor and staff appointments in the course of his career both locally and internationally. In January 2007, he became the Chief of Policy and Plans for the Nigerian Army. It was from that post that he was appointed the Chief of Staff of the Armed Forces of Liberia. He effectively commanded the AFL from 6 June 2007 to 11 February 2014, when he handed over to a Liberian Officer.

In the course of his Service, General Abdurrahman attended various military and civil courses. He was an alumnus of the Nigerian Army School of Military Engineers (NASME), the Nigerian Armed Forces Command and Staff College (AFCSC) as well as the National War College where he graduated with distinction. Abdurrahman returned to the Ahmadu Bello University for his bachelor of sciences in 1979 and master's degree in 1981, capping it with a PhD from the Heriot-Watt University in Edinburgh In 1985.

== Death ==
He died on 28 January 2015 in New York. President Ellen Johnson Sirleaf sent a message of condolences to the Government of Nigeria. He was survived by his wife, Fatima Wali-Abdurrahman and his four sons, Surajudeen, Abduljabbar, Abdulaziz and Abdulmalik.

== Honors and awards ==
Abdurrahman received the Commander of the Order of the Niger (CON) conferred on him by the Nigerian President in 2014. He was also the recipient of the National Honour Award of “Knight Commander” in the Humane Order of African Redemption by the President of Liberia in 2014, Officer of the Order of the Niger (OON) from Nigeria in 2007 and the Liberia’s highest military honour, the Distinguish Service Order (DSO) from the president of Liberia in 2009.

== Appointments ==
- GSO 3 Training, HQ Nigerian Army Engineers, Lagos (1976/77)
- Staff Officer Architecture Army HQ, Lagos (1981/83)
- Instructor, School of Military Engineering, Makurdi (1986/88)
- Commanding Officer, 21 Support Engineer Regiment, Kaduna (1989/91)
- Military Observer, UN Iraq Kuwait Observer Mission, (1991/92)
- Commanding Officer, 13 Field Engineer Regiment, Jos (1992/93)
- Directing Staff, Command & Staff College, Jaji (1993/95)
- Directing Staff, Ghana Command & Staff College, Teshi (1995/97)
- Colonel Personnel Services, Army HQ, Lagos (1997/99)
- Commander, 43 Engineer Brigade, Jos (1999/2000)
- Director Army Real Estate, Army Engineer HQ, Lagos (2001/2002)
- Directing Staff, National War College, Abuja (2002/2004)
- Director of Operations, DAOPs (AHQ), Abuja (2004)
- Director of Policy (2005)
- Chief of Army Standards and Evaluation (2006/2007)
