= James T. Phillips Jr. =

Liberian politician

Minister of Finance
- In office 1976–1979
- President: William Tolbert
- Preceded by: Edwin Williams
- Succeeded by: Ellen Johnson Sirleaf

Personal details
- Died: 22 April 1980

James T. Phillips Jr. (died 22 April 1980) was a Liberian politician. Phillips served as secretary for agriculture and commerce in the national government 1968-1971. Following the split of the government ministerial portfolio into two with the arrival of William R. Tolbert Jr. to the presidency, Phillips served as minister of agriculture between 1971 and 1976. He then served as minister of finance between 1976 and 1979.

Philipps was one of the more reform-oriented ministers in the Tolbert government. He resigned from his ministerial post over a controversy on disappeared funds allocated to a floating intended to be used for the 1979 Organization of African Unity summit. Shortly thereafter, in the wake of the military coup that brought down the Tolbert government, Phillips and 12 other officials of the former government were executed by soldiers at the beach behind the Barclay Training Center on 22 April 1980.
