= Ministry of Labour, Liberia =

Government ministry of Liberia

The Ministry of Labour of Liberia is a government ministry responsible for labour laws, issues, and employment-related matters.

== See also ==
- List of government ministries of Liberia
- Politics of Liberia
