= Ministry of Public Works, Liberia =

Government ministry of Liberia

Ministry of Public Works
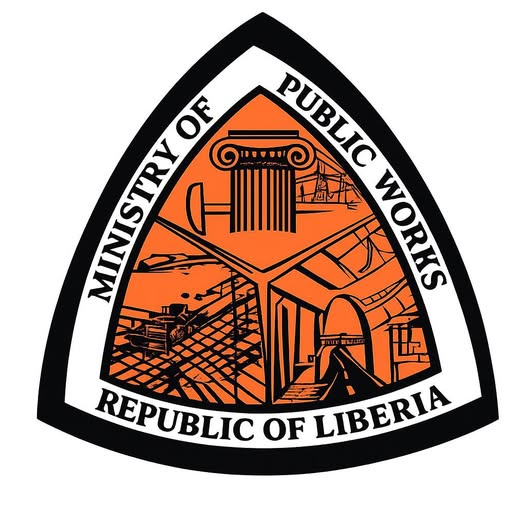

Agency overview
- Jurisdiction: Government of Liberia
- Headquarters: Monrovia, Liberia
- Minister responsible: Roland L. Giddings; Minister of Public Works
- Parent department: Ministry of Agriculture
- Website: mpw.gov.lr

The Ministry of Public Works is a cabinet-level ministry of the Government of Liberia, charged with responsibility for the planning, construction, maintenance, and regulation of public infrastructure. Its mandate includes national and feeder roads, bridges, public buildings, and other government facilities, and it serves as a principal implementing agency for infrastructure projects undertaken by the state.

Public works administration in Liberia predates the Ministry’s formal creation. Infrastructure responsibilities were initially handled through executive offices and later through the Department of the Interior. The Department of Public Works was established in 1928 to centralize these functions and was elevated to cabinet status in 1972 as the Ministry of Public Works. Following the end of the civil wars in 2003, the Ministry became a central institution in Liberia’s post-conflict reconstruction, working with international donors to rehabilitate roads, restore urban infrastructure, and rebuild public facilities.

== History ==
The Liberian Ministry of Public Works traces its origins to Liberia’s early efforts at state formation and territorial administration following independence in 1847. Although no dedicated public works ministry existed at independence, responsibilities related to roads, ports, public buildings, and urban settlements were carried out through the executive branch and later through the Department of the Interior, established in 1868.

During the 19th and early 20th centuries, public works in Liberia were closely tied to assertions of sovereignty and territorial control. Road construction, port maintenance, and settlement building were used to demonstrate “effective occupation” of the hinterland, particularly in response to European colonial expansion in West Africa. Infrastructure development relied heavily on compulsory communal labor imposed on indigenous populations, a system that became a central feature of Liberian governance during this period.

By the early 20th century, expanding road networks and administrative centers into the interior became a key state priority. These activities were often enforced by the Liberian Frontier Force and financed through hut taxes, which were frequently converted into mandatory labor for road construction and maintenance.

Establishment of the Department of Public Works (1928)

According to official government records, the Department of Public Works was established by an Act of the National Legislature in 1928. The department was created to centralize responsibility for public infrastructure, including roads, bridges, public buildings, and other government construction projects, which had previously been dispersed across different agencies. During the interwar period, public works activities increasingly supported concessionary enterprises, most notably rubber and mining operations.

Infrastructure development during this time was shaped by Liberia’s growing dependence on foreign capital and international oversight, particularly following League of Nations investigations into forced labor practices in the early 1930s.

In 1972, the Department of Public Works was reorganized and elevated to cabinet status as the Ministry of Public Works, formalizing its role as the government’s principal agency for national infrastructure planning, construction, and maintenance. During the 1970s, the Ministry oversaw the maintenance and upgrading of Liberia’s primary road corridors, many of which had been constructed earlier to serve mining and agricultural concessions. Key routes under public works administration included the Monrovia–Buchanan highway, linking the capital to the country’s second-largest port, and the Monrovia–Gbarnga road, which connected Monrovia to central Liberia. By the late 1970s, however, declining government revenues and rising maintenance costs led to increasing deterioration of paved and laterite roads, particularly outside the Monrovia metropolitan area.

Impact of the 1980 coup

The 1980 military coup d’état, which overthrew President William Tolbert, marked a turning point for Liberia’s public works sector. Although the Ministry of Public Works continued to operate under the People’s Redemption Council and subsequent governments, institutional capacity declined. Budget allocations for infrastructure were reduced, and many experienced engineers and administrators left public service.

By the late 1980s, Liberia’s road network and public facilities were widely reported as being in poor condition, with many rural roads becoming impassable during the rainy season. Donor engagement in large-scale infrastructure projects declined amid political instability, and public works projects were frequently delayed or suspended. These conditions immediately preceded the outbreak of the First Liberian Civil War in 1989, which resulted in extensive destruction of infrastructure nationwide.

Following the end of the civil wars in 2003, the Ministry of Public Works became a central institution in Liberia’s post-conflict reconstruction. The Ministry has overseen road rehabilitation, urban infrastructure renewal, and public building projects, often in partnership with international donors such as the World Bank and the African Development Bank.

== Organization ==
The Ministry of Public Works is organized into a number of technical and administrative departments responsible for the planning, construction, maintenance, and regulation of public infrastructure throughout Liberia. The Ministry is headed by a Minister of Public Works, supported by deputy ministers and departmental directors.

The Ministry’s core departments include the Department of Planning and Programming, which coordinates infrastructure planning and project development; the Department of Construction, responsible for supervising public works projects; and the Department of Maintenance, which oversees the upkeep of roads, bridges, and public facilities. Technical oversight functions are provided by the Department of Design and Engineering Services, which conducts surveying, drafting, and engineering support for public works projects.

Administrative and regulatory functions are carried out by additional units responsible for finance, human resources, procurement, and the classification and certification of contractors, reflecting the Ministry’s role in managing public infrastructure delivery and enforcing construction standards nationwide.

=== Ministers of Public Works (post-1972) ===
- Roland Layafette Giddings – Minister of Public Works (2024–present)
- Ruth Coker Collins – Minister of Public Works (2020–2024)
- Mobutu Vlah Nyenpan – Minister of Public Works (2018–2020; died in office)
- William Gyude Moore – Minister of Public Works (2014–2018)
- Samuel Kofi Woods – Minister of Public Works (2009–2014)
- Luseni Donzo – Minister of Public Works (Note: Donzo served in an acting capacity until 2007.) (2006–2009)
- Willis Knuckles – Minister of Public Works (2006)
- John T. Richardson – Minister of Public Works (1998–)

=== Secretaries of Public Works (pre-1972) ===
- Joseph Whama Boayue – Secretary of Public Works (1961–1962)
- Henry B. Duncan – Secretary of Public Works (first secretary; by 1951)
