= Hezekiah Bowen =

Liberian Army officer (1943–2010)

Chief of Staff of the Armed Forces
- In office 1996–1997
- President: Ruth Perry
- Preceded by: Sande Ware
- Succeeded by: Daniel Chea

Member of the People's Redemption Council
- In office 1980–1985
- President: Samuel Doe

Minister of National Defense

Minister of Rural Development

Superintendent of Grand Cape Mount County
- Incumbent
- Assumed office 1980
- President: Samuel Doe

Personal details
- Born: John Hezekiah Bowen c. 1943 Liberia
- Died: April 6, 2010 (aged 66–67) Monrovia, Liberia
- Profession: Soldier

Military service
- Allegiance: Liberia
- Branch/service: Armed Forces of Liberia
- Years of service: 1969–2010
- Rank: Lieutenant general
- Commands: Armed Forces of Liberia; 2nd Infantry Battalion
- Battles/wars: First Liberian Civil War

John Hezekiah Bowen (c. 1943 – April 6, 2010) was an officer of the Armed Forces of Liberia.

Bowen joined the AFL in 1969. Bowen joined the Officer Candidate School at the Military Academy in Todee in March 1971 and graduated in October 1971. He then received promotion to the rank of Second Lieutenant.

Following the 1980 coup, General Bowen was the first Superintendent of Grand Cape Mount County in the People’s Redemption Council Government of Master Sergeant Samuel K. Doe.

He also served as Commanding Officer of the 2nd Infantry Battalion and Deputy Commanding General of the AFL.

He also served as Minister of National Defense, Minister of Rural Development as well as member of the Board of Directors of the National Veteran Commission.

Charles Taylor invaded Liberia at Butuo in Nimba County on Christmas Eve 1989 with a force of around 150 men, initiating the First Liberian Civil War. Doe responded by sending two AFL battalions to Nimba in December 1989 – January 1990, under Bowen, who was then a Colonel. The Liberian government forces assumed that most of the Mano and Gio peoples in the Nimba region were supporting the rebels. They thus acted in a very brutal and scorched-earth fashion which quickly alienated the local people. Taylor's support rose rapidly, as the Mano and Gio flocked to his National Patriotic Front of Liberia seeking revenge. Many government soldiers deserted, some to join the NPFL. Doe quickly replaced Bowen as his field commander; the inability of the AFL to make any headway was one of the reasons why Doe changed the commander in the area five times in the first six months of the war.

In September 1994, General Bowen was accused of factionalizing the AFL for power at the Accra Conference. Actually, under the ECOWAS Peace Agreement, every party (including the AFL) was a major stakeholder and had the right to advance any proposal that would motivate their fighters to be disarmed and demobilized. All the parties, except the AFL, wanted a power-sharing inclusion as demand for them to be disarmed and demobilized. Other parties demanded that AFL also be disarmed and disbanded like other factions.

In response, the AFL under General Bowen's leadership submitted a Two-Count Position Paper and a One-Backup Position Paper. Under the Two-Count Position Paper, ECOWAS leaders were advised that firstly, the AFL was a national army created by law to be restructured, not disbanded, at the end of every war. Secondly, service members of the AFL listed for discharge should be discharged with honors and respect in keeping with law and Army Regulations. Under the One-Backup position Paper, it was proposed that if the AFL would be disarmed and disbanded like other warring factions, then AFL should be included in the power-sharing arrangements. At the end of the day, the ECOWAS leaders endorsed General Bowen’s Two-Count Position Paper and offered him the Defense Minister post so that he could preside over the implementation of ECOWAS Demobilization Plans for the AFL.

Then Lieutenant General Hezekiah Bowen was later mentioned in the Abuja Accords of 1996.

Bowen died of heart failure on Tuesday, April 6, 2010 at the St. Joseph's Catholic Hospital in Monrovia. His brother told STAR radio that the family had informed the President through the Defense Ministry.
