= Willis Knuckles =

Liberian politician

Acting Minister of State for Presidential Affairs
- In office 2006–2007
- Preceded by: Morris Dukuly
- Succeeded by: Edward B. McClain Jr.

Minister of Public Works
- In office 2006
- Succeeded by: Luseni Donzo

Personal details
- Born: June 29, 1946 Montserrado County, Liberia
- Died: July 28, 2014 (aged 68) Accra, Ghana
- Spouse: Hawa Sherman (m. 1969)
- Education: Cuttington College (B.S.)

Willis DeFrancis Knuckles Jr. (June 29, 1946 – July 28, 2014) was a Liberian politician. In 2006, Knuckles was appointed minister of public works by President Ellen Johnson Sirleaf. Later that same year, he was made acting minister of state for presidential affairs after a cabinet reshuffle. In 2007, Knuckles resigned as acting minister due to a sex scandal.

== Biography ==
Willis Knuckles was born on June 29, 1946, in Montserrado County. Knuckles received a high school diploma from the College of West Africa in 1963. He graduated from Cuttington College with a B.S. in physical sciences in 1967. He attended Columbia University but did not graduate. During his college career, he worked for the Ministry of Foreign Affairs. From 1964 to 1968, Knuckles was a member of Liberia's national volleyball team, which represented the country in the first All-Africa Games in 1965.

Knuckles married Hawa Sherman in 1969. The couple had children and foster children. Knuckles was Methodist.

In 1969, Knuckles served as secretary to Secretary of State J. Rudolph Grimes. He served as secretary general of the Liberia Football Association (LFA) from 1972 to 1975. He served as an assistant to Vice President James E. Greene from January 1972 to Greene's death in July 1977. Knuckles was then appointed by President William Tolbert as assistant minister for sports. He then began serving as deputy minister for youth and sports in 1979.

In 1980, Knuckles resigned as deputy minister and fled to the United States with his family following the coup d'état against President Tolbert led by Samuel Doe. He returned to Liberia in 1982. He worked with the Daily Observer newspaper between 1982 and 1984. He was also a correspondent for the BBC. In early February 1984, Knuckles was arrested by the Doe regime without charge after reporting the Daily Observer's closure in January for the BBC. According to the Committee to Protect Journalists, Knuckles was physically abused in a remote prison.

Knuckles helped reorganize the LFA. In 1984, head of state Samuel Doe became chairman of the LFA, appointing Knuckles as vice chairman. Knuckles would resign in 1986 after coming into conflict with Doe over policy. In 1988, he founded a paper, Sports World, which was discontinued in 1990 due to the outbreak of the First Liberian Civil War.

Beginning in 1992, Knuckles served as president of the company Transglobal Express Services, which served as a link between Liberians in Liberia and those abroad, in other West African countries and the United States. Knuckles served as chairman of the board of directors of the National Oil Company of Liberia under Gyude Bryant.

James Butty of Voice of America described Knuckles as one of Ellen Johnson Sirleaf's "staunch supporters". Hours after being sworn in as president, in January 2006, Sirleaf announced a partial list of cabinet picks. Knuckles was named as minister of public works. Knuckles was initially denied confirmation by the Senate, but was confirmed following a motion of reconsideration. Following the July 26 Executive Mansion fire, President Sirleaf reshuffled her cabinet. Knuckles was appointed as acting minister of state for presidential affairs, replacing Morris Dukuly.

On February 20, 2007, the Independent Newspaper published a photo of Knuckles at a sex party with two women. Knuckles would apologize to President Sirleaf and his family in the wake of the photo's release. The ruling Unity Party would publicly stand by Knuckles during the scandal. The government banned the Independent Newspaper, revoking the paper's license for a year for publishing the photo on grounds it exposed the youth to pornography. Sam Dean, managing editor of the Independent Newspaper went into hiding following the ban, alleging his and some of his workers' lives were threatened by government agents. In a speech on February 26, President Sirleaf announced the resignation of Knuckles over the scandal. In May, the ban on the Independent Newspaper would be lifted after the government lost a lawsuit.

After resigning as minister, Knuckles mostly exited public life. Knuckles died on July 28, 2014, in Accra, Ghana, after brief illness. In 2014, the Alpha Oldtimers Sports Association named a sport stadium in Paynesville in honor of Knuckles. Knuckles was a founding member of the association in 1970, and had served as its president. In 2022, President George Weah dedicated Invincible Sports Park in Monrovia. The youth training field of the park was named in honor of Knuckles.
