= Ministry of Agriculture (Liberia) =

Government ministry of Liberia

Agency overview
- Jurisdiction: Government of Liberia
- Headquarters: Monrovia, Liberia
- Minister responsible: J. Alexander Nuetah, Liberian Minister of Agriculture
- Parent department: Ministry of Agriculture
- Website: moa.gov.lr

The Ministry of Agriculture (MOA) is the government ministry responsible for the governance, management and promotion of agriculture in Liberia. The Ministry is responsible for the oversight of agronomy, animal husbandry and other agriculture industries, the economic organization of the agriculture and food industries, and national food security. The work of the Ministry is divided into sectors of Livestock Production, Agricultural Chemicals and Crop Production.

The current Minister of Agriculture is Hon. J. Alexander Nuetah, PhD. Main Ministry offices are located in Monrovia.

== See also ==
- Agriculture in Liberia
- Economy of Liberia
