= Axel Addy =

Liberian politician

Axel Marcel Addy
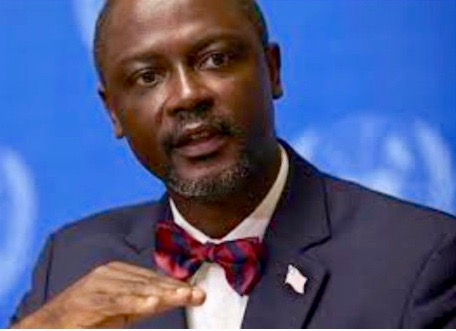

Minister for Commerce and Industry
- In office April 2013 – January 2018
- Preceded by: Miatta Beslow
- Succeeded by: Wilson Tarpeh

Deputy Minister of Commerce and Industry
- In office August 2012 – April 2013
- President: Ellen Johnson Sirleaf
- Succeeded by: Stephen Marvie

Country Representative (Liberia), Population Services International (PSI)

Personal details
- Born: August 28, 1976 (age 49) Monrovia, Liberia

Axel Marcel Addy served as Minister of Commerce and Industry under Ellen Johnson Sirleaf from April 2013 to January 2018. While in office, he focused on investment diversification, agriculture, small and medium businesses, and integration into the world economy. He was Chief Negotiator during Liberia's successful accession to the World Trade Organization.
