= Wilhelmina Jallah =

Liberian physician and politician

Wilhelmina Jallah is a Liberian physician and politician. She is Minister for Health in Liberia.

President George Manneh Weah appointed Jallah as Health Minister in February 2018. In March 2021 she launched the COVID-19 vaccination effort in Liberia, and was herself vaccinated in front of television cameras.
