= Ellen Johnson Sirleaf =

President of Liberia from 2006 to 2018

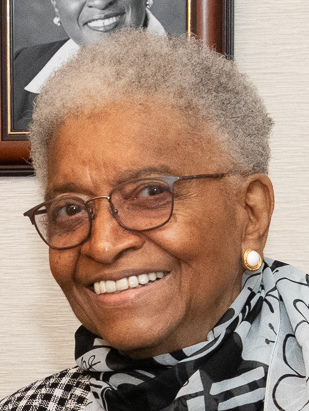
- Johnson Sirleaf in 2022

24th President of Liberia
- In office 16 January 2006 – 22 January 2018
- Vice President: Joseph Boakai
- Preceded by: Gyude Bryant
- Succeeded by: George Weah

Minister of Finance
- In office 1979 – 12 April 1980
- President: William Tolbert
- Preceded by: James T. Phillips Jr.
- Succeeded by: Perry Zulu
- In office 1990–1990
- President: Amos Sawyer
- Preceded by: Emmanuel Shaw
- Succeeded by: Stephen Byron Tarr

Personal details
- Born: Ellen Eugenia Johnson; 29 October 1938 (age 88) Monrovia, Liberia
- Party: Liberian Action Party (1985–1996); Unity (1997–2018); Independent (2018–present)
- Spouse: James Sirleaf (m. 1956; div. 1961)
- Children: 4
- Relatives: Retta (niece)
- Education: Madison Business College (AA); University of Colorado, Boulder (BA); Harvard University (MPA)
- Awards: Nobel Peace Prize (2011)
- Nickname: The Iron Lady of Africa

Ellen Eugenia Johnson Sirleaf (née Johnson; born 29 October 1938) is a Liberian politician who served as the 24th president of Liberia from 2006 to 2018. Sirleaf was the first elected female head of state in Africa. (Note: Ruth Perry served as Chairman of the Council of State of Liberia from September 3, 1996 to August 2, 1997, but was not elected president.)

Sirleaf was born in Monrovia to a Gola father and Kru-German mother. She was educated at the College of West Africa. Sirleaf is a Harvard-trained economist. She completed her education in the United States, where she studied at Madison Business College, the University of Colorado Boulder, and Harvard University. She returned to Liberia to work in William Tolbert's government as Deputy Minister of Finance from 1973 to 1974. Later, she worked again in the West, for the World Bank in the Caribbean and Latin America. In 1979, she received a cabinet appointment as Minister of Finance, serving to 1980.

After Samuel Doe seized power in 1980 in a coup d'état and executed Tolbert, Sirleaf fled to the United States. She worked for Citibank and then the Equator Bank. She returned to Liberia to contest a senatorial seat for Montserrado County in 1985, an election that was disputed. She was arrested as a result of her open criticism of the military government in 1985 and was sentenced to ten years imprisonment, although she was later released. Sirleaf continued to be involved in politics. She finished in second place at the 1997 presidential election, which was won by Charles Taylor.

Sirleaf won the 2005 presidential election and took office on 16 January 2006. She was re-elected in 2011. She was the first woman in Africa elected as president of her country. She won the Nobel Peace Prize in 2011, in recognition of her efforts to bring women into the peacekeeping process. She has received numerous other awards for her leadership. In June 2016, Sirleaf was elected as the Chair of the Economic Community of West African States, making her the first woman to hold the position since it was created.

== Family background ==
Sirleaf's father was Gola and her mother had mixed Kru and German ancestry.

While not in fact Americo-Liberian in terms of ancestry, because of her parents' upbringing and her own education in the West, Sirleaf is considered to be culturally Americo-Liberian, or assumed to be Americo-Liberian. Her parents both grew up in Monrovia, a center of Americo-Liberian influence, after being born in poor rural areas. Sirleaf does not identify as such.

Sirleaf's father, Jahmale Carney Johnson, was born into a Gola family in an impoverished rural region. He was the son of a minor Gola chief named Jahmale Carney and one of his wives, Jenneh, in Julijuah, Bomi County. Her father was sent to Monrovia for education, where he changed his surname to Johnson due to her father's loyalty to President Hilary R. W. Johnson, Liberia's first native-born president. Jahmale Johnson grew up in Monrovia, where he was raised by an Americo-Liberian family with the surname McCritty. He later entered politics; he was the first Liberian from an indigenous ethnic group to be elected to the country's national legislature.

Sirleaf's mother was also born into poverty, in Greenville. Her grandmother, Juah Sarwee, sent Sirleaf's mother to the capital, Monrovia, when her German husband (Sirleaf's grandfather) had to flee the country after Liberia declared war on Germany during World War I. Cecilia Dunbar, a member of a prominent Americo-Liberian family in the capital, adopted and raised Sirleaf's mother.

== Early life and career ==
Sirleaf was born in Monrovia in 1938. She attended the College of West Africa, a preparatory school, from 1948 to 1955. She married James Sirleaf when she was seventeen years old. The couple had four sons together, and she was primarily occupied as a homemaker. Early on in their marriage, James worked for the Department of Agriculture, and Sirleaf worked as a bookkeeper for an auto-repair shop.

She traveled with her husband to the United States in 1961 to continue her education and earned an associate degree in Accounting at Madison Business College, in Madison, Wisconsin. When they returned to Liberia, James continued his work in the Agriculture Department and Sirleaf pursued a career in the Treasury Department (Ministry of Finance). They divorced in 1961 because of James's abuse.

Sirleaf returned to college to finish her bachelor's degree. In 1970, she earned a BA in economics from the Economics Institute of the University of Colorado Boulder, where she also spent a summer preparing for graduate studies. Sirleaf studied economics and public policy at Harvard Kennedy School from 1969 to 1971, earning a Master of Public Administration. She returned to her native Liberia to work in the administration of William Tolbert, where she was appointed as Assistant Minister of Finance. Whilst in that position, she attracted attention with a "bombshell" speech to the Liberian Chamber of Commerce that claimed that the country's corporations were harming the economy by hoarding or sending their profits overseas.

Sirleaf served as Assistant Minister from 1972 to 1973 in the Tolbert administration. She resigned after a disagreement about government spending. Subsequently, she was appointed as Minister of Finance a few years later, serving from 1979 to April 1980.

Master Sergeant Samuel Doe, a member of the indigenous Krahn ethnic group, seized power in a military coup on 12 April 1980; he ordered the assassination of Tolbert and execution by firing squad of all but four members of his Cabinet. The People's Redemption Council took control of the country and led a purge against the previous government. Sirleaf initially accepted a post in the new government as the President of the Liberian Bank for Development and Investment. She fled the country in November 1980 after publicly criticising Doe and the People's Redemption Council for their management of the country.

Sirleaf initially moved to Washington, D.C., and worked for the World Bank. In 1981, she moved to Nairobi, Kenya to serve as Vice President of the African Regional Office of Citibank. She resigned from Citibank in 1985 following her involvement at the 1985 general election in Liberia. She went to work for Equator Bank, a subsidiary of HSBC.

In 1992, Sirleaf was appointed as the director of the United Nations Development Programme's Regional Bureau for Africa at the rank of assistant administrator and assistant secretary general (ASG). She is internationally known as Africa's Iron Lady, due to her political prowess. She resigned from this role in 1997 in order to run for the presidency of Liberia. During her time at the UN, she was one of the seven internationally eminent persons designated in 1999 by the Organization of African Unity to investigate the Rwandan genocide, one of the five Commission Chairs for the Inter-Congolese Dialogue, and one of the two international experts selected by UNIFEM to investigate and report on the effect of conflict on women and women's roles in peace building. She was the initial Chairperson of the Open Society Initiative for West Africa (OSIWA) and a visiting Professor of Governance at the Ghana Institute of Management and Public Administration (GIMPA).

== Political career ==
=== 1985 general election ===
While working at Citibank, Sirleaf returned to Liberia in 1985 to run for Vice President under Jackson Doe on the ticket of the Liberian Action Party in the 1985 elections. However, Sirleaf was placed under house arrest in August 1985 and soon after sentenced to ten years in prison for sedition, as a consequence of a speech in which she insulted the members of the Samuel Doe regime.Following international calls for her release, Samuel Doe pardoned and released her in September. Due to government pressure, she was removed from the presidential ticket and instead ran for a Senate seat in Montserrado County.

In the 1985 elections, Samuel Doe and the National Democratic Party won the presidency and large majorities in both houses. The elections were widely condemned as neither free nor fair. Sirleaf was declared the winner of her Senate race, but she refused to accept the seat in protest of the election fraud.

After an attempted coup against the Doe government by Thomas Quiwonkpa on 12 November 1985, Sirleaf was arrested and imprisoned again on 13 November by Doe's forces. Despite continuing to refuse to accept her seat in the Senate, she was released in July 1986. She secretly fled the country to the United States later that year.

=== 1997 presidential campaign ===
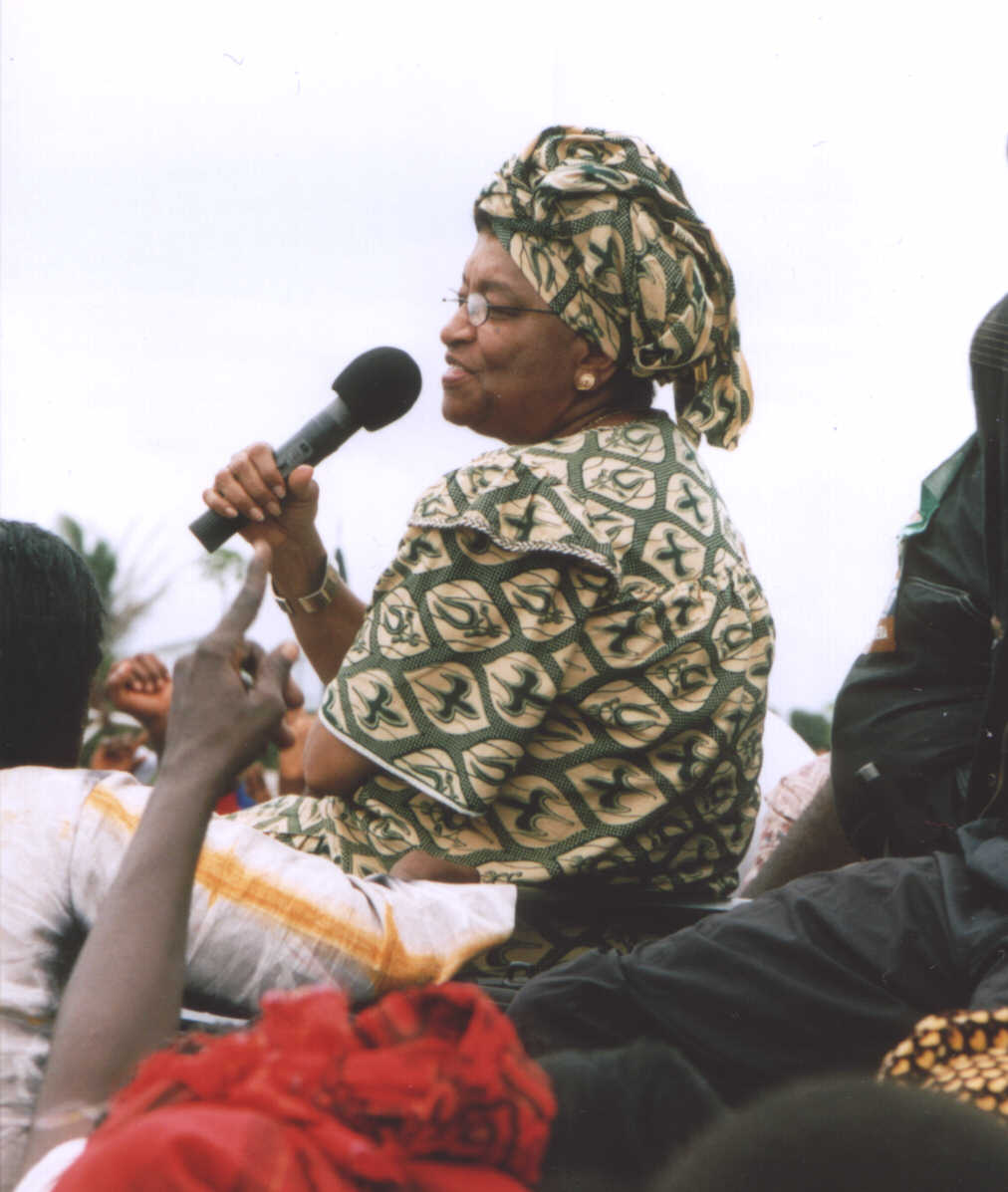
Sirleaf campaigning in Monrovia in 2005, shortly before she was elected

At the beginning of the First Liberian Civil War in 1989, Sirleaf supported Charles Taylor's rebellion against Doe. She helped raise money for the war and founded the National Patriotic Front of Liberia with Taylor and Tom Woewiyu. Because of this, Doe's government recommended that Sirleaf be banned from politics in Liberia for 30 years.

But, she later opposed Taylor's handling of the war and his treatment of rival opposition leaders such as Jackson Doe. By 1996, the presence of Economic Community of West African States (ECOWAS) peacekeepers led to a cessation of hostilities. The nation held the 1997 general election, which Sirleaf returned to Liberia to contest. She ran as the presidential candidate for the Unity Party and placed second in a controversial election, getting just under 10% of the vote to Charles Taylor's 75%, with the remaining 15% going to other candidates. After controversy about the results and being accused of treason, Sirleaf left Liberia and went into exile in Abidjan, Ivory Coast.

=== 2005 presidential campaign ===
After the end of the Second Liberian Civil War and the establishment of a transitional government, Sirleaf was proposed as a possible candidate for chairman of the government. Ultimately, Gyude Bryant, a political neutral, was chosen as chairman, while Sirleaf served as head of the Governance Reform Commission.

Sirleaf stood for president as the candidate of the Unity Party in the 2005 general election. She placed second in the first round of voting behind George Weah, a former footballer. In the subsequent run-off election, Sirleaf earned 59% of the vote versus 40% for Weah, though Weah disputed the results.

The announcement of the new leader was postponed until further election investigations were carried out. On 23 November 2005, Sirleaf was declared the winner of the Liberian election and confirmed as the country's next president and the first woman to be elected as president of an African country. Her inauguration took place on 16 January 2006. It was attended by many foreign dignitaries, including United States Secretary of State Condoleezza Rice and First Lady Laura Bush.

=== 2011 presidential campaign ===
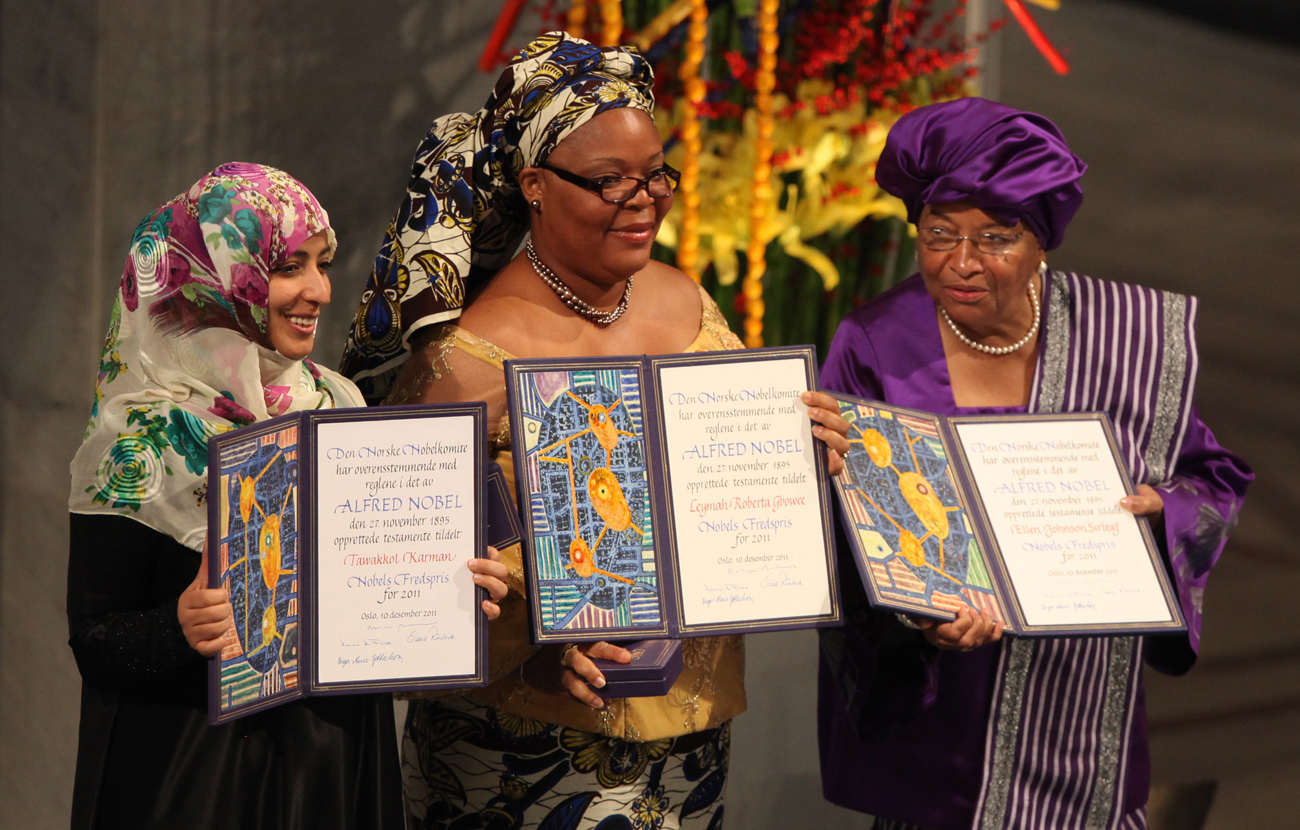
From left to right: Tawakkul Karman, Leymah Gbowee, and Ellen Johnson Sirleaf display their awards during the presentation of the Nobel Peace Prize, 10 December 2011.

In January 2010, Sirleaf announced that she would run for a second term in office in the 2011 presidential election while speaking to a joint session of the legislature. Opposition leaders noted that in doing so, she had broken a promise made during her 2005 campaign to only serve one term if elected. Sirleaf was renominated as the Unity Party's presidential candidate at the party's national convention on 31 October 2010. That same day, Vice President Joseph Boakai was nominated by Sirleaf and confirmed by the delegates as Sirleaf's running mate.

The awarding of the Nobel Peace Prize to Sirleaf four days prior to the election sparked criticism from opposition parties, with Congress for Democratic Change candidate Winston Tubman calling the award "undeserved" and "a political interference in our country's politics." Sirleaf called the timing of the award a coincidence and avoided mentioning the award during the final days of campaigning.

Sirleaf garnered 43.9% of the vote in the first round, more than any other candidate but short of the 50% needed to avoid a run-off. Tubman came in second with 32.7%, pitting him against Sirleaf in the second round. Tubman called for a boycott of the run-off, claiming that the results of the first round had been fraudulent. Sirleaf denied the allegations, and international observers reported that the first round election had been free, fair and transparent. As a result of the boycott, Sirleaf won the second round with 90.7% of the vote, though voter turnout significantly declined from the first round. Following the election, Sirleaf announced the creation of a "national peace and reconciliation initiative," led by Nobel Peace Prize laureate Leymah Gbowee, to address the country's divisions and begin "a national dialogue that would bring us together." She took the presidential oath for her second presidency on 16 January 2012.

=== 2017 presidential campaign ===
Sirleaf crossed party lines to support George Weah in the 2017 presidential campaign. In the late evening hours of 13 January 2018, she along with some officials of the Unity Party were expelled by the National Executive Committee of the party, for failing to support Unity Party presidential candidate, and Sirleaf's Vice President, Joseph Boakai.

== Presidency ==
=== Domestic policy ===
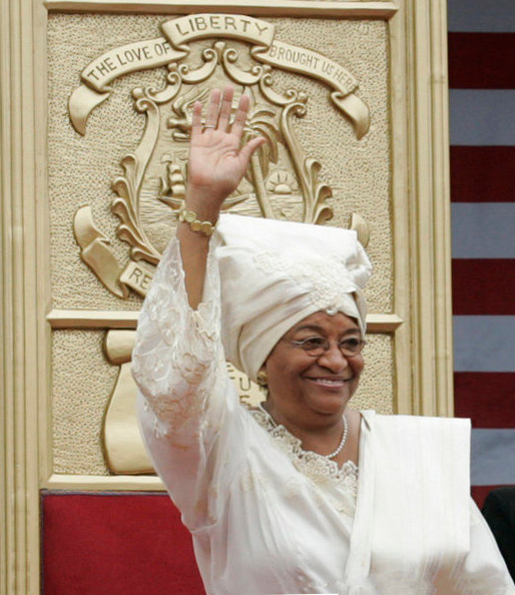
Sirleaf at her inauguration in Monrovia

A fire broke out at the Executive Mansion on 26 July 2006, seriously damaging the structure. An independent panel formed to investigate the incident ruled out arson, attributing the fire to an electrical malfunction. Sirleaf's government called funding for the repair of the mansion a low priority in the face of more pressing needs, with Sirleaf transferring her office to the nearby Foreign Ministry building and choosing to live at her personal home in Monrovia.

On 26 July 2007, Sirleaf celebrated Liberia's 160th Independence Day under the theme "Liberia at 160: Reclaiming the future." She took an unprecedented and symbolic move by asking 25-year-old Liberian activist Kimmie Weeks to serve as National Orator for the celebrations, where Weeks called for the government to prioritize education and health care. A few days later, President Sirleaf issued an Executive Order making education free and compulsory for all elementary school aged children.

On 4 October 2010, Sirleaf signed into law a Freedom of Information bill, the first legislation of its kind in West Africa. In recognition of this, she became the first sitting head of state to receive the Friend of the Media in Africa Award from The African Editor's Union.

On 1 April 2011, Sirleaf told reporters that she planned to charge an opposition candidate with sedition for organizing a rally protesting corruption in the government. Her press secretary later clarified that the remark had been an April Fools' prank.

==== Debt relief ====
From the beginning of her presidency, Sirleaf vowed to make reduction of the national debt, which stood at approximately US$4.9 billion in 2006, a top priority for her administration. The United States became the first country to grant debt relief to Liberia, waiving the full $391 million owed to it by Liberia in early 2007. In September of that year, the G-8 headed by German Chancellor Angela Merkel provided $324.5 million to paying off 60% of Liberia's debt to the International Monetary Fund, crediting their decision to the macroeconomic policies pursued by the Sirleaf administration.

In April 2009, the government successfully wrote off an additional $1.2 billion in foreign commercial debt in a deal that saw the government buy back the debt at a 97% discounted rate through financing provided by the International Development Association, Germany, Norway, the United States, and the United Kingdom. The discounted rate was the largest ever for a developing country.

The country was deemed eligible to participate in the Heavily Indebted Poor Countries initiative in 2008. In June 2010, the country reached the completion point of the HIPC initiative, qualifying it for relief from its entire external debt. That same month, the World Bank and IMF agreed to fund $1.5 billion in writing off the Liberia's multilateral debt. On 16 September, the Paris Club agreed to cancel $1.26 billion, with independent bilateral creditors canceling an additional $107 million, essentially writing off Liberia's remaining external debt. Sirleaf vowed to prevent unsustainable borrowing in the future by restricting annual borrowing to 3% of GDP and limiting expenditure of all borrowed funds to one-off infrastructure projects.

==== Truth and Reconciliation Commission ====
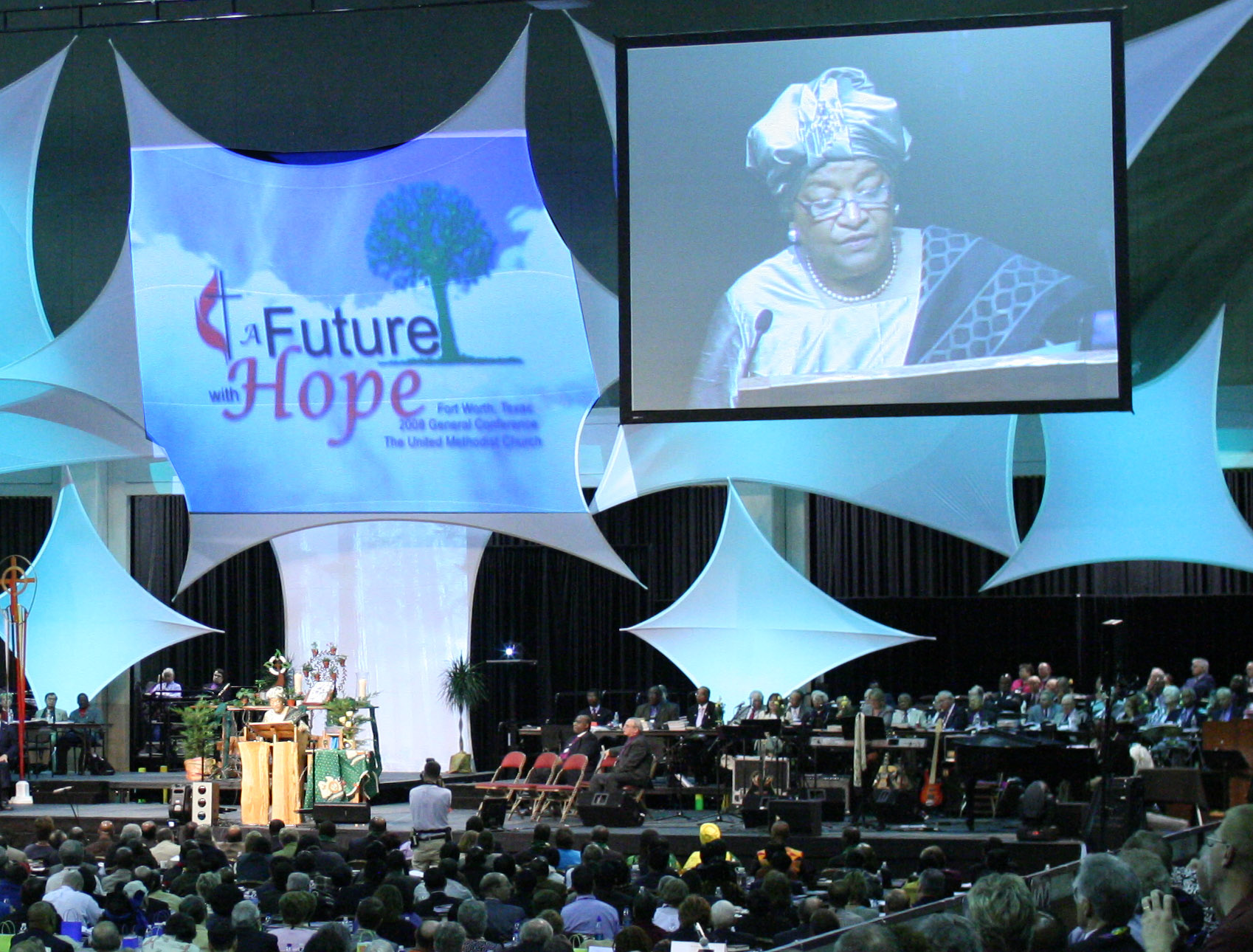
President Sirleaf addressing the 2008 General Conference of the United Methodist Church in Fort Worth, Texas

In 2006, the Truth and Reconciliation Commission began work with a mandate to "promote national peace, security, unity and reconciliation" by investigating more than 20 years of civil conflict in the country. The TRC was formed through a legislation in 2005 under the Interim government headed by C. Gyude Bryant.

In their final report, issued in June 2009, the TRC included Sirleaf in a list of 50 names of people that should be "specifically barred from holding public offices; elected or appointed for a period of thirty (30) years" for "being associated with former warring factions." The proposed ban stemmed from her financial support of former President Taylor in the early years of the First Liberian Civil War.

On 26 July 2009, Sirleaf apologized to Liberia for supporting Charles Taylor, saying: "When the true nature of Mr. Taylor's intentions became known, there was no more impassioned critic or strong opponent to him in a democratic process" than she. On 28 August, the legislature announced they must "consult our constituents for about a year" before deciding whether or not to implement the Commission's recommendations.

During an appearance at the Council on Foreign Relations in 2010, Sirleaf argued that the implementation of the TRC's recommended ban would unconstitutionally violate her right to due process. In October 2010, the chairman of Sirleaf's Unity Party, Varney Sherman, argued that implementation of the recommendation would be unconstitutional, as Article 21(a) of the Constitution prohibits ex post facto laws, and Sirleaf had broken no law by financially supporting Taylor that imposed a ban from public office as a penalty.

In January 2011, the Supreme Court ruled in Williams v. Tah, a case brought by another person recommended for being banned from public office in the TRC report, that the TRC's recommendation was an unconstitutional violation of the listed individuals' right to procedural due process, and that it would be unconstitutional for the government to implement the proposed bans.

==== Gay rights ====
Following a speech made by United States Secretary of State Hillary Clinton in December 2011 that America's foreign aid would be used to promote the protection of gay rights, the issue of LGBT rights became a significant political topic in Liberia. According to The Guardian, "Since Clinton's remarks, Liberian newspapers have published numerous articles and editorials describing homosexuality as 'desecrating', 'abusive' and an 'abomination'." Liberian law made "voluntary sodomy" punishable by up to one year in prison, although it has not been used to prosecute anyone in several years.

In February 2012, Bong County Senator Jewel Taylor proposed a bill that would carry a term of ten years in prison for homosexual activity, while a similar bill was introduced in the House of Representatives. On 19 March, Sirleaf addressed the issue, saying that she would not repeal the current law but would also not sign into law either of the two proposed bills. Sirleaf added, "We like ourselves just the way we are [...] We've got certain traditional values in our society that we would like to preserve." According to Tiawan Gongloe, Liberia's former Solicitor General, "If she tried to decriminalise the [current anti-gay] law it would be political suicide."

In a letter to The Guardian, Sirleaf's press secretary challenged the portrayal of her remarks in the media saying that: "There currently exists no law referencing homosexuality in Liberia, and as such the President could not be defending a law on homosexuality. The President is on record as saying [...] that any law brought before her regarding homosexuality will be vetoed. This statement also applies to an initial attempt by two members of the Liberian legislature to introduce tougher laws targeting homosexuality." The letter added "the status quo in Liberia has been one of tolerance and no one has ever been prosecuted under that [current] law," and went on to hint at future possible liberalization stating that "the President thinks that with the unprecedented freedom of speech and expression Liberia enjoys today, our budding democracy will be strong enough to accommodate new ideas and debate both their value and Liberia's laws with openness, respect and independence." The Guardian published a correction to its story: "'Nobel peace prize winner defends law criminalising homosexuality in Liberia' was updated to restore material cut in the editing process. The restored material clarifies the stance that President Ellen Johnson Sirleaf is taking on laws concerning homosexuality in Liberia. That is: she refuses to dismantle the existing anti-sodomy law, while also saying she will refuse to sign two new bills that would toughen laws on homosexuality." The comments, letter, and clarification suggest that she considered the status quo for gay rights in Liberia to be one of de facto tolerance until the recent controversy, and did not support decriminalization of homosexuality, but also refused to support further criminalisation of homosexual acts which was being attempted in Liberia. She reaffirmed this view during an interview with Tony Blair.

=== Foreign policy ===
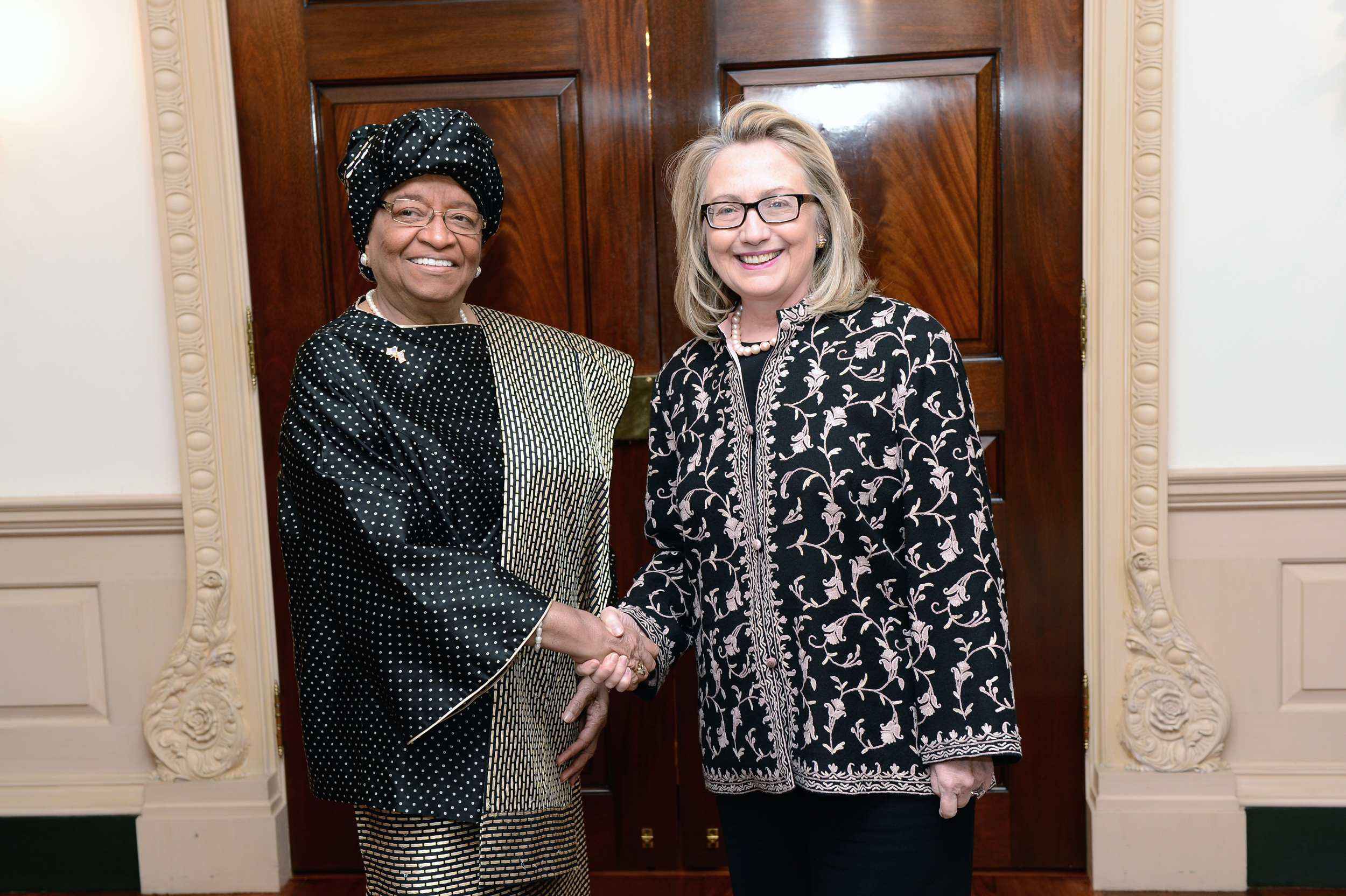
Sirleaf with U.S. Secretary of State Hillary Clinton, Washington, D.C., 2013

Upon her election to office, Sirleaf made her first foreign trip as President to neighboring Ivory Coast, meeting with Ivorian President Laurent Gbagbo in an attempt to repair relations between the two countries following Côte d'Ivoire's support of the Movement for Democracy in Liberia during the Second Liberian Civil War. During the 2010–2011 Ivorian crisis, Sirleaf, as chairperson of the Mano River Union, supported ECOWAS's recognition of Gbagbo's opponent, Alassane Ouattara, as the winner of the disputed presidential election, but rejected calls for a military solution to the crisis.

Sirleaf also forged close relations with the United States, Liberia's traditional ally. Following the establishment of United States Africa Command (AFRICOM) by the United States military, Sirleaf offered to allow the U.S. to headquarter the new command in Liberia, the only African leader to do so. The command was eventually headquartered in Stuttgart, Germany. On 15 March 2006, President Sirleaf addressed a joint meeting of the United States Congress, asking for American support to help her country "become a brilliant beacon, an example to Africa and the world of what love of liberty can achieve."

Sirleaf has also strengthened relations with the People's Republic of China, reaffirming Liberia's commitment to the One-China policy. In return, China has contributed to Liberia's reconstruction, building several transmitters to extend the Liberia Broadcasting System nationwide and constructing a new campus for the University of Liberia.

Sirleaf is a member of the Council of Women World Leaders, an international network of current and former women presidents and prime ministers whose mission is to mobilize the highest-level women leaders globally for collective action on issues of critical importance to women and equitable development.

During the 2011 Libyan civil war, Sirleaf added her voice to the international community who asked the previous Libyan leader Muammar al-Gaddafi to cease the use of violence and tactics of political repression. However, she criticized the international military intervention in Libya, declaring that "violence does not help the process whichever way it comes". Her government later severed diplomatic ties with Libya, stating that "The Government took the decision after a careful review of the situation in Libya and determined that the Government of Colonel Gaddafi has lost the legitimacy to govern Libya."

On 27 February 2015, President Sirleaf was expected to make a visit to U.S. President Barack Obama at the White House in Washington, D.C., according to an official online statement from the Office of the White House Press Secretary. Among other issues, they planned to discuss the hope to expeditiously close the recent 2013–2015 Ebola virus epidemic, which heavily affected Liberia, Sierra Leone, and Guinea, and other areas in West Africa (and beyond in other countries due to importation of cases for treatment and some new infections), down to an ideal of zero reported cases in Liberia and nearby areas in the near future, with continuing monitoring and reporting, care, support, and fiscal and professional assistance. They also planned to discuss how to sustain and rebuild the healthcare infrastructure and the country's other difficulties in the wake of the massive outbreak's morbidity and mortality toll and impact on the area, as well as review progress that had been made and efforts to continue it.

=== Administration and Cabinet ===
Following her victory in the 2005 election, Sirleaf pledged to promote national reconciliation by bringing in opposition leaders into her administration. Opposition politicians who joined her initial administration included Minister of Transport Jeremiah Sulunteh, Minister of Education Joseph Korto, and Ambassador to the United Nations Nathaniel Barnes. Sirleaf also appointed several women to high-level posts in her administration, with female ministers initially leading the Ministries of Finance, Law, Commerce and Industry, Gender and Development, and Youth and Sports. Sirleaf said that while she had planned on appointing an all-female cabinet, she had been unable to find qualified female candidates for every position.

Upon her inauguration, Sirleaf promised that she would impose a "zero tolerance" policy on corruption within the government. Despite this, critics have argued that corruption remains rampant within Sirleaf's administration; Information Minister Lawrence Bropleh was sacked in 2008 over allegations that he had stolen more than $200,000 in state funds, while Internal Affairs Minister Ambullai Johnson, Sirleaf's brother, was dismissed in 2010 after the disappearance of funds for county development. Sirleaf herself has acknowledged that corruption in government remains, noting that her zero tolerance policy was hampered by the need to pass major economic reforms through the legislature, a goal that would have been impeded by significant anti-corruption legislation and prosecutions. However, Sirleaf has rejected claims that she has failed to fight corruption, pointing to the establishment of the Liberian Anti-Corruption Commission and the restructuring of the General Auditing Commission.

Sirleaf dismissed her entire cabinet from office on 3 November 2010, promising to reassemble the cabinet in as short a time as possible. She argued that the move was taken to give her administration a "clean slate" in preparation for the final year of her term, though critics argued that the move was aimed to bolster her chances at reelection by confronting corruption in her administration. By early December 2010, Sirleaf had reconstituted her entire cabinet, replacing seven of her nineteen ministers.

Sirleaf was accused in 2014 of interfering with a criminal investigation involving her stepson Fombah Sirleaf and the security agency. Her Minister of Justice Christiana Tah resigned in October 2014, accusing President Sirleaf of interference with the criminal investigation into the illegal seizure of money from Korean businessmen by the NSA in a warrantless hotel raid in July 2014.

==== First Cabinet ====
The First Sirleaf Cabinet
Office	Name	Term
President	Ellen Johnson Sirleaf	2006–2012
Vice President	Joseph Boakai	2006–2012
Minister of Foreign Affairs	George Wallace; Olubanke King Akerele; Toga McIntosh	2006–2007; 2007–2010; 2010–2012
Minister of Finance	Antoinette Sayeh; Augustine Kpehe Ngafuan	2006–2008; 2008–2012
Minister of Justice and Attorney General	Frances Johnson-Morris; Philip A. Z. Banks; Christiana Tah	2006–2007; 2007–2009; 2009–2012
Minister of National Defense	Brownie Samukai	2006–2012
Minister of Internal Affairs	Ambullai Johnson; Harrison Kahnweah	2006–2010; 2010–2012
Minister of Education	Joseph Korto; E. Othello Gongar	2006–2010; 2010–2012
Minister of Posts and Telecommunications	Jackson E. Doe; Jeremiah Sulunteh; Frederick B. Norkeh	2006–2008; 2008–2010; 2010–2012
Minister of Public Works	Willis Knuckles; Luseni Donzo; Samuel Kofi Woods	2006; 2007–2009; 2009–2012
Minister of Agriculture	Christopher Toe; Florence Chenoweth	2006–2009; 2009–2012
Minister of Health and Social Welfare	Walter Gwenigale	2006–2012
Minister of Information, Culture and Tourism	Johnny McClain; Lawrence Bropleh	2006; 2006–2009
Minister of Planning and Economic Affairs	Toga McIntosh; Amara Mohamed Konneh	2006–2008; 2008–2012
Minister of Lands, Mines and Energy	Eugene Shannon; Roosevelt Jayjay	2006–2010; 2010–2012
Minister of Commerce and Industry	Olubanke King Akerele; Frances Johnson-Morris; Miatta Beysolow	2006–2007; 2007–2008; 2008–2012
Minister of Gender, Children and Social Protection	Vabah Gayflor	2006–2012
Minister of Labor	Samuel Kofi Woods; Tiawon Gongloe; Vabah Gayflor	2006–2009; 2009–2010; 2010–2012
Minister of Youth and Sports	Jamesetta Howard Wolokollie; Etmonia Tarpeh	2006–2007; 2007–2012
Minister of Transport	Jeremiah Sulunteh; Jackson E. Doe; Alphonso Gaye; Willard Russell	2006–2008; 2008–2009; 2009–2010; 2010–2012
Minister of State for Presidential Affairs	Morris Dukuly; Willis Knuckles; Edward B. McClain Jr.	2006; 2006–2007; 2007–2012

==== Second Cabinet ====
The Second Sirleaf Cabinet
Office	Name	Term
President	Ellen Johnson Sirleaf	2012–2018
Vice President	Joseph Boakai	2012–2018
Minister of Foreign Affairs	Augustine Kpehe Ngafuan; Marjon Kamara	2012–2015; 2015–2018
Minister of Finance	Amara Mohamed Konneh; Boima Kamara	2012–2016; 2016–2018
Minister of Justice and Attorney General	Christiana Tah; Benedict F. Sannoh; Frederick Cherue	2012–2014; 2014–2016; 2016–2018
Minister of National Defense	Brownie Samukai	2012–2018
Minister of Internal Affairs	Blamo Nelson; Morris Dukuly; Henrique Tokpa	2012–2013; 2013–2015; 2015–2018
Minister of Education	Etmonia David Tarpeh; George Werner	2012–2015; 2015–2018
Minister of Posts and Telecommunications	Frederick B. Norkeh	2012–2018
Minister of Public Works	Samuel Kofi Woods; Antoinette Weeks; Gyude Moore	2012–2013; 2013–2014; 2014–2018
Minister of Agriculture	Florence Chenoweth; Moses Zinnah	2012–2014; 2014–2018
Minister of Health and Social Welfare	Walter Gwenigale; Bernice Dahn	2012–2015; 2015–2018
Minister of Information, Culture and Tourism	Lewis Brown; Lenn Eugene Nagbe	2012–2016; 2016–2018
Minister of Lands, Mines and Energy	Patrick Sendolo	2002–2018
Minister of Commerce and Industry	Miatta Beysolow; Axel Addy	2012–2013; 2013–2018
Minister of Gender, Children and Social Protection	Julia Duncan-Cassell	2012–2018
Minister of Labor	Juah Lawson; Neto Z. Lighe	2012–2014; 2014–2018
Minister of Youth and Sports	Tornorlah Vapilah; Lenn Eugene Nagbe; Saah N'tow	2012–2013; 2013–2016; 2016–2018
Minister of Transport	Lenn Eugene Nagbe; Angela Cassell Bush	2012–2013; 2013–2018
Minister of State for Presidential Affairs	Edward B. McClain Jr.	2012–2016

=== Judicial appointments ===
Upon the inauguration of Sirleaf, the entire Supreme Court bench, which had been selected as part of the transitional government in 2003, stepped down, leaving Sirleaf to fill all five seats on the Court. Sirleaf nominated Johnnie Lewis, a Yale Law School graduate and former Circuit Court judge, for the office of Chief Justice. Lewis and three of Sirleaf's Associate Justice nominees, J. Emmanuel Wureh, Francis Korkpor and Gladys Johnson, were confirmed by the Senate on 2 March 2006. Sirleaf's nomination of Kabineh Ja'neh, a former leader in the rebel LURD movement, as Associate Justice received criticism from the opposition Congress for Democratic Change due to concerns over Ja'neh's human rights record during the civil war, and Ja'neh was not confirmed until 9 May.

Following the death of Justice Wureh in July 2006, Sirleaf nominated Christiana Tah, a deputy minister at the Justice Ministry, to fill his seat. However, the Senate later rejected Tah's nomination, leading Sirleaf to nominate her Minister of Youth and Sports, Jamesetta Howard Wolokollie, who was confirmed. Justice Johnson retired from the Court on 26 March 2011 after reaching the constitutionally mandated retirement age of seventy. Sirleaf nominated Phillip A. Z. Banks, her former Minister of Justice and Chairman of the Law Reform Commission, to replace Johnson in August 2011. Banks was confirmed by the Senate on 20 August 2011.

=== International image ===
Forbes magazine named Sirleaf as the 51st most powerful woman in the world in 2006. In 2010, Newsweek listed her as one of the ten best leaders in the world, while Time counted her among the top ten female leaders. That same year, The Economist called her "arguably the best president the country has ever had." In 2010, Sirleaf released her first book, This Child Will Be Great: Memoir of a Remarkable Life by Africa's First Woman President. In November 2017, an investigation conducted by the International Consortium of Investigative Journalism cited Sirleaf among the list of politicians named in "Paradise Papers" allegations.

== Life after politics ==
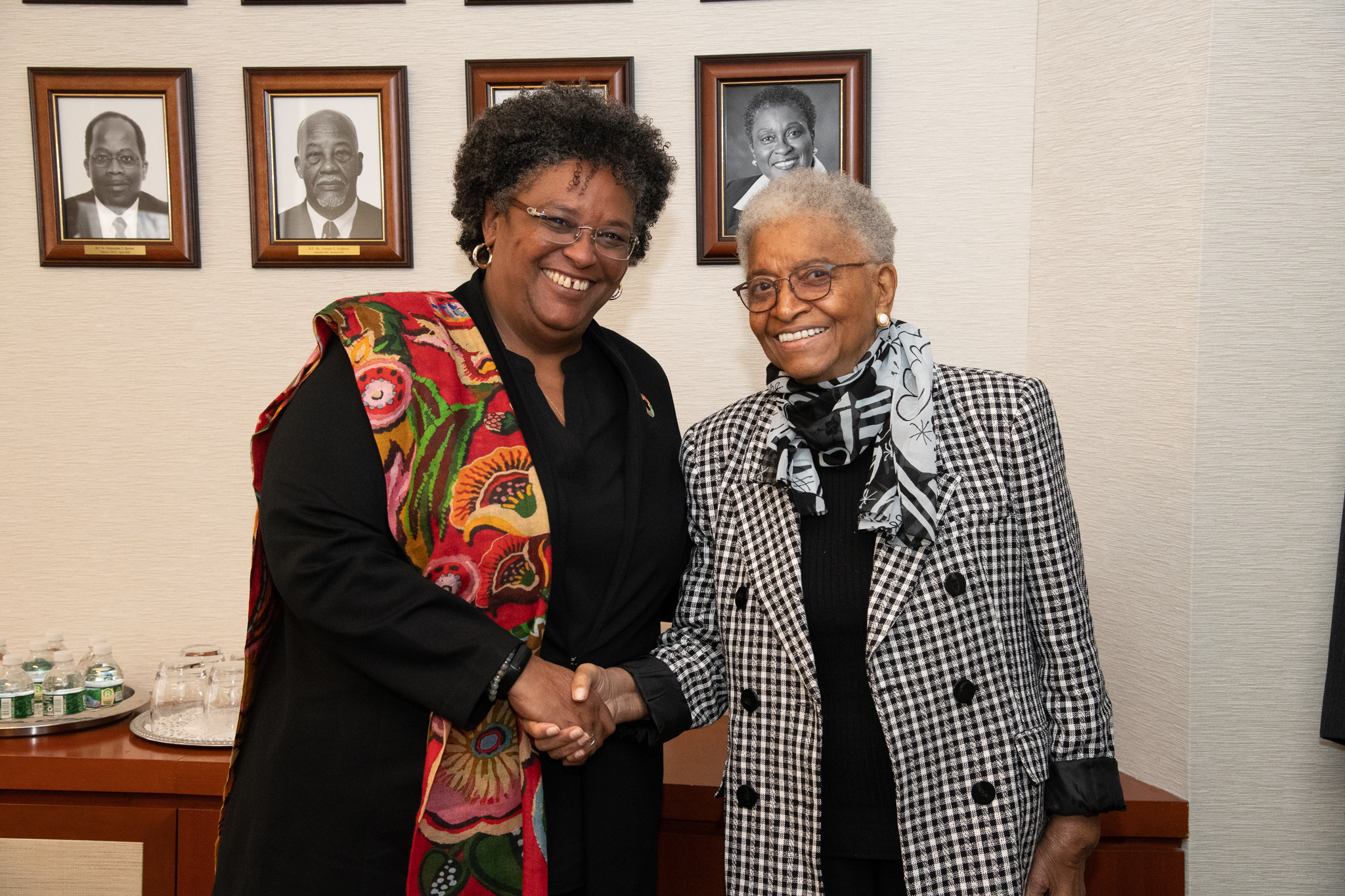
Ellen Johnson Sirleaf (on right) with Mia Mottley, Prime Minister of Barbados, in 2022

In 2018, Sirleaf founded the Ellen Johnson Sirleaf Presidential Center for Women and Development, which aims "to be a catalyst for change across Africa, by helping unleash its most abundant untapped power – its women". In 2019, her son, Charles Sirleaf, was charged with economic sabotage through the unlawful printing of local currency to the value of US$75 million. The investigation was carried out by investigative auditing firm Kroll.

In 2019, Director-General of the World Health Organization Tedros Adhanom appointed Sirleaf as the WHO Goodwill Ambassador for the health workforce. Amid the COVID-19 pandemic in 2020, she stepped down from this post to serve as co-chair (alongside Helen Clark) of the WHO's Independent Panel for Pandemic Preparedness and Response (IPPR). Also in 2020, she was appointed to the Development Advisory Council of the U.S. International Development Finance Corporation.

In addition, Ellen Johnson Sirleaf holds a number of paid and unpaid positions, including the following:

- Africa Europe Foundation (AEF), Member of the High-Level Group of Personalities on Africa-Europe Relations (since 2020)
- Brenthurst Foundation, Member of the Advisory Board
- Mastercard Foundation, Member of the Board of Directors (since 2020)

== Personal life ==
In 1956, Ellen Johnson married James Sirleaf. They had four sons together before their divorce. She grew up as a Presbyterian, but later joined her husband's Methodist faith. Through her sons, she has ten grandchildren.

While attending college in the United States, Sirleaf became a member of the Alpha Kappa Alpha sorority, and she is an honorary member of the Links, Incorporated. She is the aunt to American actress/comic Retta (born Marietta Sirleaf), best known for her role as Donna Meagle on the NBC comedy Parks and Recreation.

Several of her children served in the Liberian government. Her son Robert Sirleaf served as head of the National Oil Company of Liberia, Charles Sirleaf holds a senior position at the Central Bank of Liberia, and stepson Fombah Sirleaf heads the Liberian National Security Agency, with responsibility for internal security. Other members of the Sirleaf family are serving in other positions in government.

In December 2021, James Sirleaf, one of the sons of Ellen Johnson Sirleaf, died in his residence in Liberia under unknown circumstances. He was 64. In June 2024, Charles E. Sirleaf, another of Ellen Johnson Sirleaf's four sons, died after a brief illness. He was 68. Both men had followed their mother into politics and government work and were public servants for much of their careers.

== Honors and awards ==
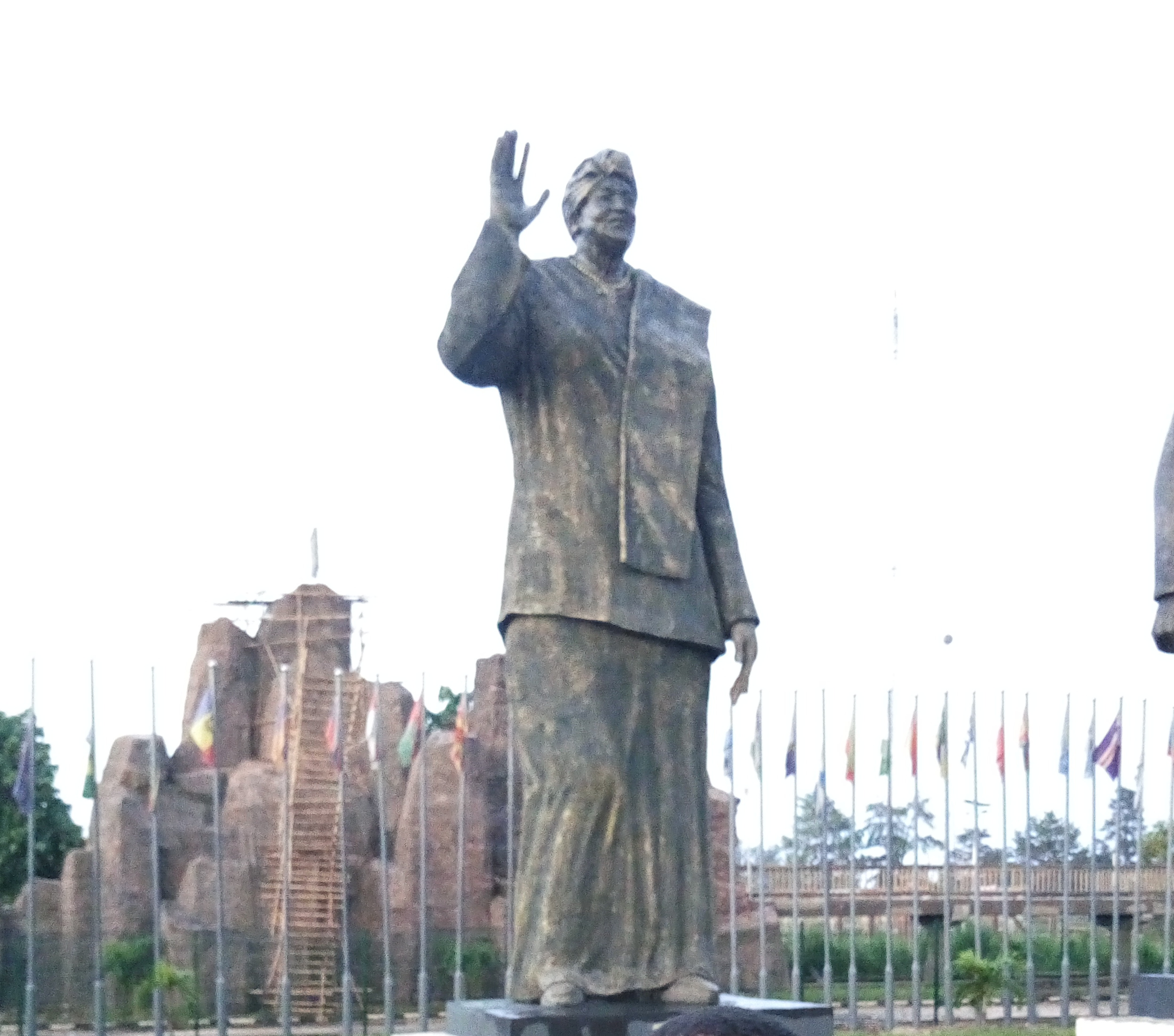
A statue of Sirleaf unveiled in Owerri's Ikemba Ojukwu Square (Imo state, Nigeria) in 2017

- Ralph Bunche International Leadership Award
- Chief of Order of the Golden Heart of Kenya
- Grand commander Star of Africa Redemption of Liberia
- 1988: Recipient of the 1988 Roosevelt Institute Freedom of Speech Award
- 1996: Commander of the Order of Mono
- 2006: Common Ground Award recipient, Search for Common Ground
- 2006: Laureate of the Africa Prize for Leadership for the Sustainable End of Hunger, The Hunger Project
- 2006: Distinguished Fellow, Claus M. Halle Institute for Global Learning, Emory University
- 2006 Awarded Honorary Doctor of Laws from Marquette University
- 2006: David Rockefeller Bridging Leadership Award from Synergos
- 2007: Presidential Medal of Freedom, the highest civilian award given by the United States, awarded to Sirleaf by U.S. President George W. Bush on 5 November 2007
- 2008: Golden Plate Award of the American Academy of Achievement
- 2008: Awarded Honorary Doctor of Laws degree from Indiana University, Dartmouth College; and Brown University.
- 2009: Awarded the EITI Award for "the rapid progress the country has made towards implementation of the EITI"
- 2009: Awarded Honorary Doctor of Humane Letters degree from the University of Tampa
- 2010: Awarded Honorary Doctor of Laws degree from Yale University and Rutgers, The State University of New Jersey
- 2010: Friend of the Media in Africa Award from The African Editor's Union
- 2011: Awarded Honorary Doctor of Laws degree from Harvard University
- 2011: African Gender Award
- 2011: Nobel Peace Prize
- 2012: Indira Gandhi Prize for Peace, Disarmament and Development
- 2014: Listed as the 70th most powerful woman in the world by Forbes.
- 2017: She was awarded a title in the Nigerian chieftaincy system by Eze Samuel Ohiri of Imo, Nigeria. As a result, she is now the Ada di Ohanma of Igboland.
- 2017: She was recognized as one of the BBC's 100 Women of 2017.
- 2018: Won the 2017 version of the Ibrahim Prize for Achievement in African Leadership
- 2019: In 2019, Time created 89 new covers to celebrate women of the year starting from 1920; it chose her for 2006
- 2023: TIME100 Impact Award

=== National ===
- Liberia:
  - Grand Master and Grand Cordon of the Order of the Pioneers of Liberia
  - Grand Master and Grand Cross of the Order of the Star of Africa

=== Foreign ===
- Finland
  - Grand Cross with Collar of the Order of the White Rose of Finland (2009)
- France:
  - Grand Cross of the National Order of the Legion of Honour
- Ivory Coast:
  - Grand Cross of the National Order of the Ivory Coast (7 September 2017)
- Kenya:
  - Chief of Order of the Golden Heart of Kenya
- Namibia:
  - First Class of the Order of the Welwitschia (2018)
- Togo:
  - Commander of the Order of Mono (1996)
- United States:
  - Presidential Medal of Freedom (2007)

== Other honors ==
In 2011, Sirleaf was jointly awarded the Nobel Peace Prize with Leymah Gbowee of Liberia and Tawakkol Karman of Yemen. The three women were recognized "for their non-violent struggle for the safety of women and for women's rights to full participation in peace-building work."

Sirleaf was conferred the Indira Gandhi Prize by Indian President Pranab Mukherjee on 12 September 2013. In 2016, she was listed as the 83rd-most powerful woman in the world by Forbes magazine.

== Published works ==
- Johnson Sirleaf, Ellen; Nyirjesy, Francis (1991). The Outlook for Commercial Bank Lending to Sub-Saharan Africa (Report). World Bank.
- Johnson Sirleaf, Ellen (1999). "From Disaster to Development". In Cahill, Kevin (ed.). A Framework for Survival: Health, Human Rights, and Humanitarian Assistance in Conflicts and Disasters. New York: Routledge. ISBN 978-0-415-92235-7.
- Johnson Sirleaf, Ellen; Rehn, Elizabeth (2002). Women, War and Peace: The Independent Experts' Assessment on the Impact of Armed Conflict on Women and Women's Role in Peace-building. New York: UNIFEM. ISBN 0-912917-66-0.
- Johnson Sirleaf, Ellen (2009). "Foreword". In Van Der Gaag, Nikki (ed.). Because I am a Girl: In the Shadow of War. Woking: Plan UK. pp. 10–11. ISBN 978-0-9550479-4-7.

== See also ==
- Black Nobel Prize laureates
- List of female Nobel laureates
- Iron Ladies of Liberia
- List of peace activists
- West African Ebola virus epidemic
- 2014 Ebola virus epidemic in Liberia
- Ellen Johnson Sirleaf
- United Nations Mission for Ebola Emergency Response

== Sources ==
- Anderson, Jon Lee. "Letter from Liberia: After the Warlords", The New Yorker, 27 March 2006. Retrieved 14 December 2010.
- Johnson Sirleaf, Ellen (2009). This Child Will Be Great: Memoir of a Remarkable Life by Africa's First Woman President. New York: HarperCollins. ISBN 978-0-06-135347-5.

Political offices
Preceded by James T. Phillips	Minister of Finance; 1979–1980	Succeeded by Perry Zulu
Preceded by Emmanuel Shaw	Minister of Finance; 1990	Succeeded by Byron Tarr
Preceded by Gyude Bryant	President of Liberia; 2006–2018	Succeeded by George Weah
Awards and achievements
Preceded by Liu Xiaobo	Laureate of the Nobel Peace Prize; 2011; With: Leymah Gbowee and Tawakkol Karman	Succeeded by European Union
