= Edward B. McClain Jr. =

Liberian politician

Minister of State for Presidential Affairs
- In office 2007 – 23 July 2016
- President: Ellen Johnson Sirleaf
- Preceded by: Willis Knuckles

Personal details
- Born: 18 November 1944 Liberia
- Died: 23 July 2016 (aged 71) Pretoria, South Africa
- Education: College of West Africa, Cuttington College and Divinity School, University of Besançon

Edward B. McClain Jr. (18 November 1944, Liberia - 23 July 2016, Pretoria was a Liberian politician. He was the minister of state for presidential affairs and chief of staff to President Ellen Johnson Sirleaf.

He was born on 18 November 1944. His father's family was from Mhanwruune Quarter of Picnicess, in Grand Kru County. He was a nephew on his mother's side of President William Richard Tolbert Jr. McClain graduated from the College of West Africa and Cuttington College and Divinity School with a BSc degree in chemistry and biology. He then studied psychiatry at the University of Besançon in France. He then resided in Abidjan, in the Ivory Coast, where he befriended Sirleaf.

Sirleaf and McClain returned to Liberia in 2003. He was a key member of her electoral campaign. Initially in 2006, President Sirleaf appointed McClain as minister of state without portfolio. After the resignation of Willis Knuckles, McClain was made acting minister of state for presidential affairs in 2007. In her second term, Sirleaf renominated McClain as minister of state for presidential affairs.

McClain died in office on 23 July 2016 while undergoing medical treatment in Pretoria, South Africa.
