= Alain Noudéhou =

Beninese diplomat (born 1966)

- The DSRSG/RC/HC of South South Sudan, Alain Noudéhou.

United Nations, Resident Coordinator, and Humanitarian Coordinator

Deputy Special Representative of the Secretary-General of the United Nations

Personal details
- Born: 1966 (age 59–60)
- Citizenship: Beninese
- Education: Msc
- Alma mater: Carnegie Mellon University & Tsinghua University in China

Alain Noudéhou (born 1966) is a Beninese diplomat who has been serving as Deputy Special Representative for the United Nations Multidimensional Integrated Stabilization Mission in Mali (MINUSMA) and Resident Coordinator in Mali since 2021, serving alongside Special Representative Mahamat Saleh Annadif. He was previously the Deputy Special Representative of the Secretary-General of the United Nations, Resident Coordinator, and Humanitarian Coordinator in South Sudan.

== Early life and education ==
Noudéhou holds a master's degree in Public Policy and Management from Carnegie Mellon University in the US and completed his undergraduate degree at Tsinghua University in China.

== Career ==
=== Early career ===
Before joining the UN, Noudéhou was the first Country Director of CHF (now Global Communities) in South Africa from 1996- 2000 and later the Deputy Director of Program Initiatives at CHF Headquarters in Maryland, USA (2000 – 2002).

=== Career with the United Nations ===
Noudéhou started his career with the United Nations in 2002 as UNDP Assistant Resident Representative in Gabon and then moved to Rwanda as UNDP Deputy Representative in Rwanda in 2004. In 2007, he moved to Tanzania as UNDP's Country Director.

The Secretary General of the United Nations Ban Ki-moon in July 2010, announced Noudéhou as UN Resident Coordinator, Humanitarian Coordinator and UNDP Resident Representative in Zimbabwe.

Before moving to South Sudan, Noudéhou was Chief of Staff and Director of Executive Office (ExO) of United Nations Development Programme (UNDP) in New York.

In May 2014, Ban appointed Noudéhou as the UN Resident Coordinator and UNDP Resident Representative in the People's Republic of China where he served until 2016. He led the UN Country Team (UNCT), consisting of 21 heads of UN agencies in China.

In August 2017, United Nations Secretary-General António Guterres, announced the appointment of Noudéhou as his Deputy Special Representative in the United Nations Mission in South Sudan (UNMISS), Resident Coordinator, Humanitarian Coordinator and UNDP Resident Coordinator.
