= Cornelia Kruah-Togba =

Liberian politician

Hon. Cornelia Wonkerleh Kruah
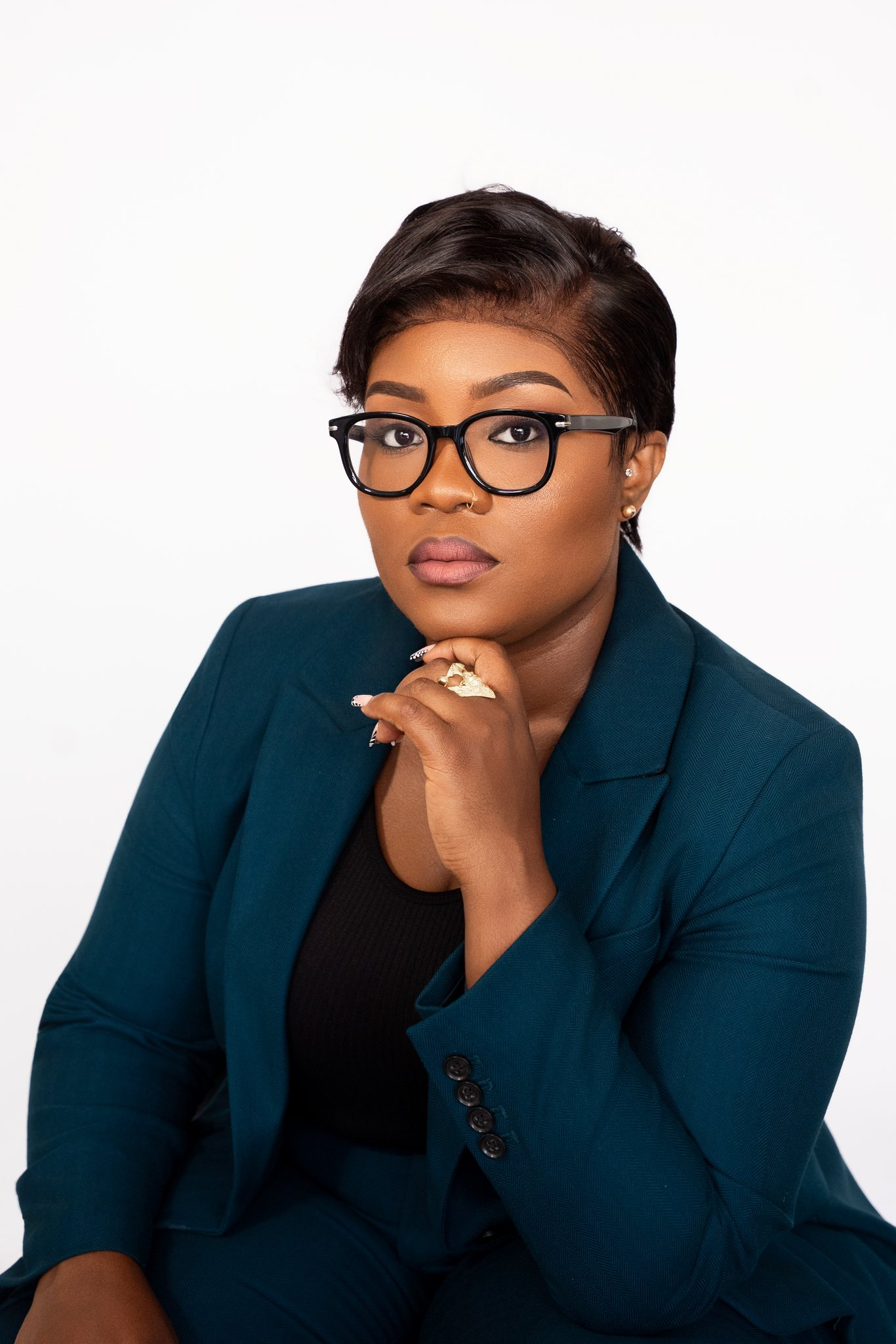

Minister of Youth and Sports
- Incumbent
- Assumed office 8 February 2026
- Preceded by: Cllr Jerror Cole Bangalu

Ministry of State, Liberia
- In office 4 February 2024 – 6 February 2026
- Preceded by: Wesseh Blamo
- Succeeded by: Bill McGill Jones

Personal details
- Born: 27 June 1990 (age 36) Liberia
- Party: Unity Party
- Education: Stella Maris Polytechnic University, Louis Arthur Grimes School of Law, African Leadership Academy, Kingston University

Cornelia Kruah is a Liberian politician and member of the Unity Party. She currently serves as Minister of Youth and Sports and has previously held positions, including Deputy Minister for Administration at the Ministry of State for Presidential Affairs. Within her party, she has served as Assistant Secretary General for Press and Public Affairs and National Vice Chair for Inter-Party and National Election Affairs.

== Early life and education ==
Cornelia Kruah was born in Montserrado County, Liberia. She is an Attorney-at-Law and holds a Master’s degree in International Politics and Economics from Kingston University in London, United Kingdom. She earned a Bachelor of Science degree in Economics from Stella Maris Polytechnic in Liberia and obtained a certificate in Leadership, Entrepreneurship, and African Studies from the African Leadership Academy in Johannesburg, South Africa.

== Political career ==
Cornelia Kruah joined the Unity Party in 2011 as a member of an auxiliary group called the University Students for Re-election of President Ellen Johnson Sirleaf, where she served as Secretary General. After the 2011 election, the group was restructured as the University Student Initiative, with Kruah appointed as its head. Following the 2018 election, she was elected Assistant Secretary General for Press and Public Affairs, succeeding Mo Ali, who was promoted to Secretary General of the party. She held this position until 2022, when she was elected National Vice Chair for Inter-Party and National Election Affairs.

== Representative Aspirant ==
Kruah contested the 2018 elections as the Unity Party candidate for District 13, Montserrado County. She finished third, behind Edward Papay Flomo, the eventual winner, and John Weah. She ran again in the 2023 elections for the same seat and finished second, with Flomo retaining the position.

== Administrative Roles in Government ==
In 2024, Kruah was appointed Deputy Minister for Administration at the Ministry of State for Presidential Affairs by President Joseph Boakai. She served in this role until February 2026, when she was appointed Minister of Youth and Sports. The Liberian Senate confirmed her appointment on February 17, 2026, and she officially assumed office on February 23, 2026.

== Community Initiatives ==
Since 2020, Cornelia Kruah‑Togba has implemented a personal initiative to support small businesses in Liberia. The program provides financial assistance to petty traders and informal sector entrepreneurs, aiming to promote economic empowerment and improve livelihoods at the community level.

In 2025, Cornelia Kruah undertook a personal microfinance and empowerment initiative targeting petty traders in Montserrado County’s District 13. The initiative, funded from her personal resources, aimed to support small-scale informal businesses, particularly women engaged in petty trading. The program was implemented in two phases. The first phase, conducted in April 2025, reportedly disbursed approximately L$600,000 to petty traders. The second phase, carried out in July 2025, provided an additional L$500,000 alongside the distribution of umbrellas to beneficiaries, bringing the total number of recipients across both phases to over 100 traders. The initiative formed part of a broader effort to promote grassroots economic empowerment and improve the livelihoods of informal sector workers within the district.

== Dispute ==
In February 2025, she was involved in a public dispute with an employee of her ministry concerning remuneration. The employee reportedly requested a salary increase, citing his assistance during a previous election. She stated that the employee had repeatedly approached her and had physically assaulted her. The incident gained media attention after the employee was filmed protesting by positioning himself under Kruah‑Togba’s vehicle. Cornelia maintained that she would not provide a pay increase under duress.

== Honor ==
- Order of the Star of Africa, Republic of Liberia
