= Samuel Kofi Woods =

Liberian journalist

- Born: May 1, 1964 (age 61); Monrovia
- Education: University of Liberia, Leiden University, Columbia University
- Occupation: Lawyer/Activist

Samuel Kofi Woods (born May 1, 1964) is a Liberian human rights activist, journalist, politician and academic. In 1994, he founded the Forefront Organization, which documented human rights abuses during the Second Liberian Civil War.

== Biography ==
Woods was born in Monrovia on May 1, 1964. He was one of twenty children. Woods has worked tirelessly in the field of human rights and has been vigilant in exposing child labor practices and injustice throughout Liberia. Active even while a student, he was first arrested in 1981. During the Liberian civil war in 1989 Woods escaped to Ghana, but returned to Liberia in 1991 and founded a human rights organization, the Catholic Justice and Peace Commission. He operated a radio program aimed at exposing improper arrests, unlawful executions and informing citizens of their civil rights. In 1994 Woods created the Forefront Organization in order to shed light on human rights abuses during the Second Liberian Civil War.

In 2006, Woods became the Minister of Labor under President Ellen Johnson Sirleaf, only to become Minister of Public Works in 2009 following a cabinet shake-up.

== Awards ==
He won the Reebok Human Rights Award in 1994 and received the Pope's human rights medal. Woods graduated with a Master of Arts in Development Studies, and a specialization International Law and Organization for Development at the International Institute of Social Studies under Erasmus University Rotterdam in The Hague, Netherlands.
