= Ministry of Health and Social Welfare, Liberia =

Government ministry of Liberia

The Ministry of Health and Social Welfare is a government ministry of the Republic of Liberia.

From 2006 to 2015 the Health Minister was Dr. Walter Gwenigale. As of 2014, the ministry was engaged in a major public health campaign to control the Ebola virus epidemic in Liberia.

In June 2015 Bernice Dahn became the Health Minister.

In February 2018 President George Weah appointed Wilhelmina Jallah as Health Minister.

In February 2024, Dr. Louise M. Kpoto became the Health Minister.

== See also ==
- Health in Liberia
- List of health departments and ministries
