= J. Alexander Nuetah =

Liberian public servant

Dr. J. Alexander Nuetah

Liberia Minister, Ministry of Agriculture
- Incumbent
- Assumed office January 2024
- Appointed by: Joseph Boakai
- President: Joseph Boakai
- Preceded by: Jeanine Cooper

Personal details
- Born: Liberia
- Occupation: Academic and Politician
- Profession: Economist
- Portfolio: Agricultural economy

J. Alexander Nuetah is a Liberian agricultural economist, academic, and public servant. He has been serving as Liberia's minister of agriculture since January 2024. Prior to the appointment, Nuetah served as Assistant Minister for Economic and Financial Sector Policy, and later as Assistant Minister for External Resources and Debt Management at Liberia’s Ministry of Finance and Development Planning from 2014 to 2015. Since the early 2000s, he has been involved in economic planning, food security, and agricultural development in Liberia. He holds a master's and a Ph.D. in regional and agricultural economics from China Agricultural University in Beijing. Nuetah has also worked with international organizations, including the IMF, and World Bank and contributed to Liberia’s agricultural reform through the National Agriculture Development Plan (2025–2029).

== Education ==
Nuetah earned a Bachelor of Science degree in general agriculture from the University of Liberia. He obtained both his master's and Ph.D. degrees in regional and agricultural economics from China Agricultural University in Beijing. Additionally, in 2019, he was a Dongfang Scholar at Peking University.

== Academic career ==
Between 2017 and 2024, Nuetah served as an Assistant Professor of Agricultural Economics at the University of Liberia and as a part-time lecturer at the African Methodist Episcopal University. In 2021, he was among 31 faculty members honored by the University of Liberia for research contributions during its 101st Commencement. His publications include analyses of China's investment patterns in Sub-Saharan Africa.

== Public services ==
Nuetah began his public service career in 2003 as a planning officer at Liberia's Ministry of Agriculture. He later served as a senior economist at the Ministry of Finance, focusing on macroeconomic analysis and forecasting. In 2014, he was appointed Assistant Minister for Economic and Financial Sector Policy at the Ministry of Finance and Development Planning until October 2015. In 2023, he became Assistant Minister for External Resources and Debt Management.

In January 2024, Nuetah was appointed Liberia's minister of agriculture. In this role, he has been instrumental in formulating the National Agriculture Development Plan (NADP) 2025–2029. The NADP focuses on a value-chain approach encompassing production, aggregation, processing, marketing, and consumption, targeting four subsectors: food crops, tree crops, fruits, and livestock. The NADP aligns with President Boakai's "ARREST Agenda," emphasizing agriculture as a critical component for economic growth and food security.

== International work ==
Nuetah held positions as an economist at the International Monetary Fund in Washington, D.C., from 2015 to 2016 and as a food security consultant with the World Bank in Liberia from 2023 to 2024.

In 2020, amid reports of discrimination against Africans in Guangzhou during the COVID-19 pandemic, Nuetah urged calm and solidarity, emphasizing his long-standing experience in China and the importance of preserving strong China-Africa relations amid public health measures.
