= Geraldine George =

Liberian military officer

Minister of National Defense
- Incumbent
- Assumed office 12 February 2024
- President: Joseph Boakai
- Preceded by: Prince C. Johnson III

Personal details
- Born: 29 July 1975 (age 51) Monrovia, Liberia
- Education: African Methodist Episcopal University; Webster University; United States Army Command and General Staff College
- Profession: Soldier

Military service
- Allegiance: Liberia
- Branch/service: Armed Forces of Liberia
- Years of service: 2006–2026
- Rank: Brigadier general
- Commands: Armed Forces of Liberia; 23rd Infantry Brigade

Geraldine Janet George (born 29 July 1975) is a Liberian soldier who has served as the country's Defense Minister since 2024.

== Early life and education ==
Geraldine Janet George was born in Monrovia on 29 July 1975.

George graduated from the College of West Africa. She has a Bachelor of Arts in criminal justice from the African Methodist Episcopal University in Monrovia and a master's degree in International relations from Webster University in Missouri, United States. In 2013, she was the sixth Liberian and first female to graduate from the United States Army Command and General Staff College in Fort Leavenworth, Kansas.

== Career ==
George enlisted in the Armed Forces of Liberia (AFL) on 24 July 2006 after the end of the civil war. George has said her first passion was law, but after witnessing the destruction of the country, she believed she could do more to rebuild as part of the AFL. Only about 3% of the AFL is female.

George served in the United Nations peacekeeping mission in Mali as part of MINUSMA.

George was an infantry brigade commander in the AFL, serving in the 23rd Infantry Brigade, as well as serving as a Provost Marshall and Legal Officer. She has also held posts as Assistant Chief of Staff for Personnel and Assistant Chief of Staff for Operation. In 2019, she was promoted to the rank of brigadier general and was appointed Deputy Chief of Staff.

George was appointed acting Minister of Defense by President Joseph Boakai in February 2024, and then confirmed as Minister of Defense on 30 April, becoming the first woman to hold the position. The previous minister, Prince C. Johnson III, was forced to resign during protests by wives of AFL soldiers over low wages and poor living conditions.

== Awards and honors ==
George was awarded the United Nations Medal in 2017.

In April 2026, she was inducted into the International Hall of Fame of the United States Army Command and General Staff College in recognition of her "distinguished service and exemplary leadership" in the AFL.
