= Eugene Lenn Nagbe =

Liberian politician (born 1969)

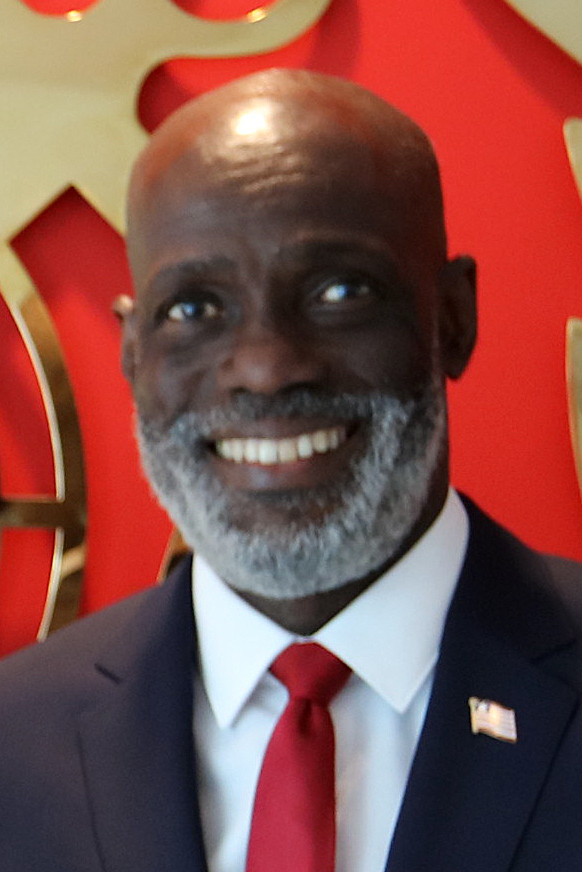
Nagbe in 2023

Eugene Lenn Nagbe (born August 11, 1969) is a Liberian politician. He served as the Commissioner of the Liberia Maritime Authority of the Republic of Liberia from 2020 to 2024. He resigned his position due to political reasons.

== Personal life ==
Nagbe was born on August 11, 1969, in Harper Maryland County, Southeastern Liberia. He undertook primary and secondary education in Harper before enrolling at the University of Liberia where he earned a bachelor's degree in mass communication. He is married to Marcia Gooding.

== Appointments ==
Nagbe was Secretary-General of the Congress for Democratic Change (CDC), a political party in Liberia organized and formed by former soccer player and President of Liberia George Weah.

Nagbe was previously an assistant police commissioner from 1998 to 2000, Chief of Staff to the Vice President of Liberia from 2000 to 2003 and Minister of Post and Telecommunications from 2003 to 2006.

Nagbe served as the Minister of Information, Cultural Affairs, and Tourism from 2016 until October 2020.

On October 1, 2020, President George Weah named Nagbe as maritime commissioner of the Liberia Maritime Authority. Nagbe resigned on January 18, 2024.
