= Prince C. Johnson II =

Liberian military officer

Lieutenant General Prince C. Johnson II was a Liberian military officer.

Johnson hailed from a Mano family. He joined the Armed Forces of Liberia in 1977.

During the First Liberian Civil War, Johnson served as Chief of Staff of the EMG Division of the National Patriotic Front of Liberia between 1993 and 1996. When Charles Taylor became President of Liberia in 1997, Johnson was named Commanding General of the AFL.

Johnson suffered a car crash in September 1999 whilst returning to Monrovia. He died in October 1999, whilst undergoing treatment for his injuries at a clinic in Côte d'Ivoire.
