= Ministry of National Defense (Liberia) =

Government ministry of Liberia

Ministry of Defence of Liberia
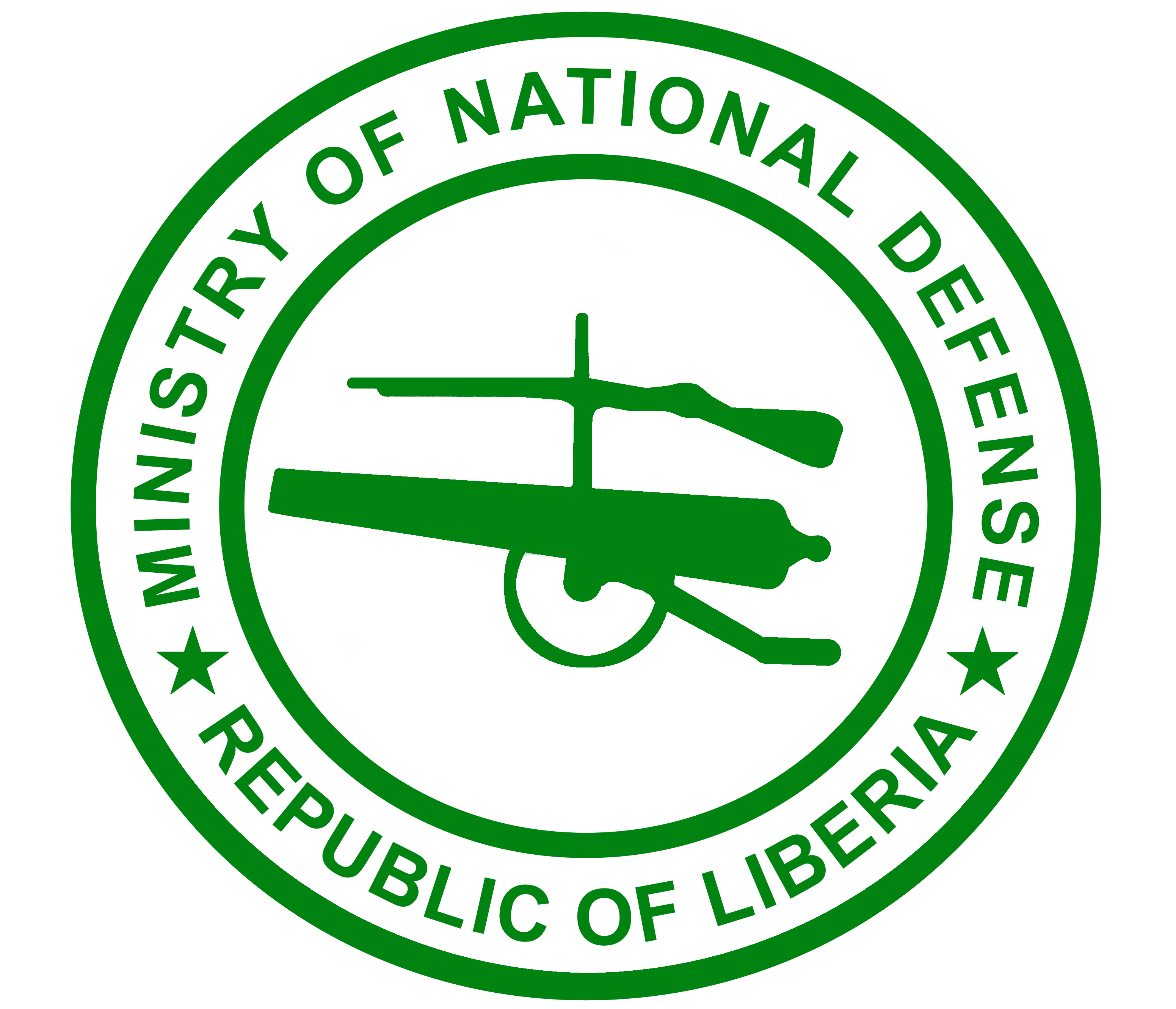

Agency overview
- Formed: 25 February 1955; 71 years ago
- Jurisdiction: Government of Liberia
- Headquarters: Barclay Training Center, Monrovia
- Minister responsible: Major General Geraldine George (acting), Minister of Defense
- Agency executives: Tibli Olandrus Dickson., Deputy Minister for Administration
- Website: mod.gov.lr

The Ministry of National Defense of Liberia is the government ministry responsible for the maintenance of the national defense and the governance of the Armed Forces of Liberia.

== History ==
An amendment to the Liberian Constitution allowed the previously named War Department to be renamed the Department of National Defense on February 25, 1955. Then, during the early years of President William Tolbert's Administration after 1971, all departments were renamed Ministries and thus the organization became the Ministry of National Defense. Brigadier General Geraldine Janet George (Rtd.) was confirmed by the Liberian Senate as Minister of National Defense on April 30, 2024

The Ministry's three-story building used to be located on Benson Street in downtown Monrovia, but upon the conclusion of the DynCorp / PA&E training effort in Liberia, moved to the Barclay Training Center, also located in central Monrovia, in July 2009. In early August 2009 the Ministry's Comptroller was dismissed, apparently for misappropriating US$50,000 intended for paying soldiers of the rebuilt AFL.

== List of ministers ==
=== Secretaries of War and the Navy (1848-1971) ===
- Joseph Jenkins Roberts (1848-1876)
- Reginald A. Sherman (1876-1892)
- Colonel Anthony D. Williams Jr. (1892-1900)
- George B. Padmore
- Robert T. Sherman
- Wilmot H. Dennis
- Columbus Harris
- Isaac Moart
- James F. Cooper
- B.W. Payne
- James W. Cooper
- Momolu Massaquoi
- Joseph Dennis
- Henry Reed Cooper
- J. Foulton Dunbar
- Wilkins Tyler
- Isaac Whisnant
- Ernest J. Yancy
- Ernest C. Jones, (1950-1960)
- Harrison Grisby, (1960-1963)
- Robert A. Brewer (1963-1968)
- Everett Jonathan Goodridge (1968-1970)

=== Ministers of Defense (1971-present) ===
- Allen H. Williams (1970-1976)
- Harry A. Greaves (1976–1978)
- M. Burleigh Holder (1978–1979)
- James Y. Gbabee (1979–1980)
- Samuel Bennie Pearson (April 1980-1981)
- Albert Karpeh (1981-1982)
- Grey Dio-Glaye Allison (1982-August 1989)
- J. Boima Barclay (1989–9 September 1990 )
- Edward Benyah Kesselly (January 1991 - 1993)
- Arthur Dennis, (1993 - March 1994)
- Sande Ware, (May 1994 - August 1995)
- J. Hezekiah Bowen (1995–1997)
- Daniel Chea (1997–2006), as National Transitional Government of Liberia Defense Minister
- Brownie J. Samukai (2006–2017)
- Major General Daniel Ziankahn (22 January 2018-9 February 2024)
- Prince C. Johnson III (9 February 2024-12 February 2024)
- Brigadier General Geraldine J. George (13 February 2024-)

== See also ==
- Politics of Liberia
