= Bernice Dahn =

Dr Bernice T. Dahn (born 1959), is the Vice President of Health Sciences University of Liberia, and served as the former Minister of Health heading the country's Ministry of Health and Social Welfare from 2015-2018. For almost nine years prior, Dr. Dahn served as Liberia’s Deputy Minister of Health and Chief Medical Officer (CMO). Having taught medical students at her alma mater, A.M. Dogliotti School of Medicine, for thirteen years, Dr. Dahn is now focused on improving academic and administrative systems for the UL College of Health Sciences, where she has established new schools of Public Health and Midwifery while reforming curricula and training pathways for doctors and pharmacists.

== Education ==
In 1999, Dahn received a Certificate of Competence from Regional Training of Trainers for Reproductive Health at Mauritius Institute of Health in Pamplemousses, Mauritius; followed by a Certificate on International Health from the School of Public Health & Community Medicine at University of Washington, and a Certificate on Health Management from the International Health Exchange and Cooperation Center at the Ministry of Health, Beijing in the People's Republic of China.

In 1987, Dahn earned a Bachelor of Science in Zoology from the University of Liberia. In 1996, Dahn earned a Doctor of Medicine from A. M. Dogliotti College of Medicine at University of Liberia in Monrovia, Liberia. Dahn then earned a Master of Public Health in Health Services with a focus on international health from the University of Washington in Seattle, Washington in 2005.

== Professional career ==
Dahn previously held positions as Reproductive Health Adviser at United Nations Population Fund for four years, Family Health Director at the Liberia Ministry of Health for three years and a year as the Director for Nutrition at the Liberia Ministry of Health.

== Other activities ==
- Global Fund to Fight AIDS, Tuberculosis and Malaria, Alternate Member of the Board (representing the West and Central Africa group)
