= National Security Agency (Liberia) =

Liberian intelligence agency

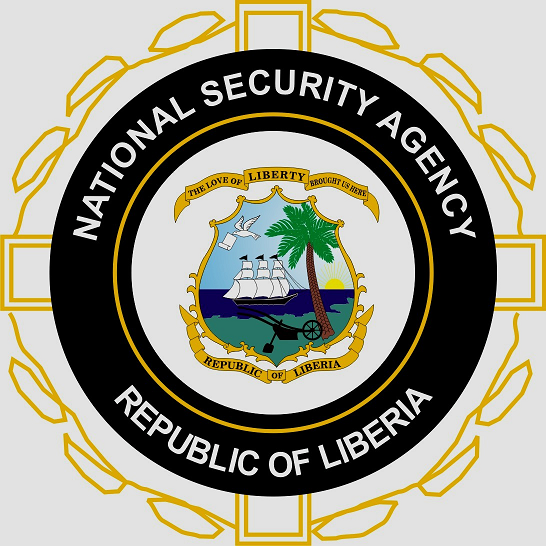
- Seal of the National Security Agency of Liberia

Agency overview
- Formed: 1974
- Jurisdiction: Government of Liberia
- Headquarters: Montserrado R.L. 6°27′54.34″N 10°40′21.21″W
- Agency executives: Major General, Prince C. Johnson III (rtd); Director
- Website: www.nsa.gov.lr

The National Security Agency (NSA) functions as the paramount civilian national intelligence and security apparatus of the Republic of Liberia, operating under the direct executive authority of the President of Liberia.

The agency’s statutory purviews and operational mandates encompass the execution of clandestine and covert operations, global intelligence monitoring, and intelligence-led counterinsurgency and counterterrorism. Furthermore, its institutional responsibilities extend to political warfare operations against foreign adversaries, support for irregular warfare operations, and the establishment of a civilian security intelligence network. Within the state infrastructure, the NSA is tasked with the protection of classified civilian government assets and information. Additionally, the agency is legally mandated to collect, process, and analyze foreign intelligence and counterintelligence data derived from Liberian communications networks and information systems to safeguard national security.

The NSA relies on a variety of measures to accomplish its mission, the majority of which are clandestine and covert operations.

The National Security Agency (NSA) is a merger of the National Bureau of Investigation (NBI) which was responsible for covert and overt security investigations, whilst the Executive Action Bureau (EAB) was responsible for carrying out clandestine activities for the Executives.

== History ==
=== Formation ===
The origins of the National Security Organization can be traced back to the 1950s, where there existed only rudimentary security services. In 1955, largely as a consequence of an alleged attempt of the life of the president, a series of securities bodies were reorganized or created. Between 1955 and 1966, the following came into existence: National Police Force (NPF) (first organized in 1924 and reorganized in the 1950s); National Bureau of Investigation (NBI); National Central Bureau (INTERPOL); Executive Action Bureau (EAB); National Intelligence and Security Service (NISS); Special Security Service (SSS); and Office of National Security. The foregoing represent President William V.S. Tubman Security organizations. President William R. Tolbert Jr., effected mergers and reorganization so that the National Security during the administration of President Tubman, similar function to that of the EAB was carried out by the National Intelligence Service (NISS), but on the highest national level. Conversely, the NISS was dissolved following the death of President Tubman and the subsequent taking over of power by President Williams R. Tolbert, Jr., leaving the EAB at the time as the only clandestine agency.

On May 20, 1974, an act repealing sub-chapter D of Chapter 1, Part 1 and subchapter B of Chapter 22, Part II of the Executive Law in Relation to the EAB and the NBI, and creating the NSA was approved. The NSA was left as the only agency solely responsible for gathering national security intelligence, but having to conduct special investigations, whenever the need arises. Later, on August 30, 1974, the Act creating the National Security Agency (NSA) was published by the Ministry of Foreign Affairs in Monrovia, Liberia.

== Mission ==
The National Security Agency (NSA) is dedicated to gathering domestic and foreign intelligence with implications for national security.

The NSA also leads the Government of Liberia in cryptology that encompasses both Signals Intelligence (SIGINT) and Information Assurance (IA) products and services, and enables Computer Network Operations (CNO) in order to gain a decision advantage for the Nation and their allies under all circumstances.

== Vision ==
To safeguard Liberia's sovereignty, uphold national security, and ensure the protection of its citizen.

The NSA aspires to be in intelligence and security through integrity, professionalism, and innovation. The Agency envisions remaining at the forefront of safeguarding the nation's interest s through proactive intelligence, strategic partnerships, and the promotion of a safe and secure environment conducive to sustainable development and prosperity for all Liberians.

== Vigilance, Integrity, Secrecy, Excellence ==
                 V  I  S  E
