= Tolbert family =

American political family from South Carolina

The Tolbert family is an American family which figured most prominently in politics in South Carolina and, by extension, Liberia. Originating from Presbyterian Scots-Irish migrants from County Antrim in Ireland, the family is historically rooted in Abbeville, Newberry and Greenwood counties in South Carolina. The family opposed secession, despite John Robert and his sons being drafted into the Confederate Army, and John Robert's family became heavily involved in leading the South Carolina Republican Party's Black-and-tan faction from the 1870s to the 1930s.

== Notable members ==
- Robert Tolbert (1765–1843). Married Nancy Ann (Red) Tolbert (1764–1856), who had migrated from County Antrim in Ireland in 1773.
  - Robert Red Tolbert Sr. (1808–1866) married Elizabeth (Henderson) Tolbert (1813–1884). Had ten children including John Robert, George Whitfield, Joseph Warren (died young), Thomas Nathaniel, twins Elias Lake and Nancy Ann (died in infancy), Walter Red, Elias Lake, Nancy Ann, and Dan Paden.
    - John Robert Tolbert (1834–1918), drafted into the Confederate Army during the American Civil War, reaching the rank of Captain. Customs collector in the port of Charleston. Elected to the South Carolina House of Representatives as a Republican in 1872. Appointed state superintendent in 1876 but not allowed to take office when Democrats took control of state government. Republican candidate for South Carolina's 3rd congressional district in 1890 and 1892. Married Elizabeth Pope (Payne) Tolbert (1839–1872). Father of Robert "R.R.", Joseph Warren and Thomas Payne Tolbert.
      - Robert Red "R.R." Tolbert Jr. (1863–1938), Postmaster at Greenwood, S.C., 1884–1885, 1889–1894; candidate for U.S. Representative from South Carolina 3rd District, 1898; delegate to Republican National Convention from South Carolina, 1900, 1908 (alternate), 1912, 1920 (member, Resolutions Committee), 1924 (member, Committee on Permanent Organization), 1928 (Convention Vice-President). Married Lucy (Collins) Tolbert. Father of Joseph Augustus Tolbert, Thomas Payne, George C., Mark P., Jesse, John R., Lucia Jerucia Gillette, Betty and an unknown daughter.
        - Joseph Augustus Tolbert (1891–1940), Lawyer; U.S. Attorney for the Western District of South Carolina, 1923–1933; delegate to Republican National Convention from South Carolina, 1924, 1928 (member, Credentials Committee), 1936; candidate for U.S. Senator from South Carolina, 1936; candidate for Governor of South Carolina, 1938. Briefly organized the South Carolina chapter of the American Fascisti, known as the Black Shirts. Died from a self-inflicted gunshot at his home in Greenville.
      - Joseph Warren "Tieless Joe" Tolbert (1865–1946). Delegate to Republican National Convention from South Carolina, 1900 (alternate), 1908, 1912, 1916, 1920, 1924, 1928, 1936 (member, Committee to Notify Presidential Nominee); member of Republican National Committee from South Carolina, 1912–1924; South Carolina Republican state chair, 1925–1931. Used his influence under Republican presidential administrations to appoint almost federal job in the state, including postmasters, federal district attorneys and bailiffs, the collector of customs duties for the port of Charleston, and U.S. marshals. Married to Julia Elizabeth DeLoach (1877–1963). Fatally injured by a car in his front yard in a controversial accident in Ninety Six.
      - Thomas Payne "Tom" Tolbert (1859–1940), protested the disenfranchisement of African American voters by collecting affidavits from African American voters who were not allowed. The violent reaction against him by white Democrats led to the Phoenix election riot. One of several members of the Tolbert family who temporarily fled Greenwood County in the aftermath of the riot and intense persecution. Later built the fireproof Rock House in rural Greenwood County.

== Link to Liberia ==
In addition, numerous African Americans were held on the White Hall plantation in prior to the white Tolbert family buying the property in the 1870s. Many ex-slaves assumed the Tolbert surname. Notable descendants include:

- Daniel Frank Tolbert (1849–1889), a farm laborer who resided in Ninety Six prior to migrating to Liberia in April 1878 as part of the Liberian exodus aboard the ship Azor with his son William and wife Sarah. Allegedly adopted plural marriage after arrival and had nearly 50 children. Died of dengue fever.
- William Tolbert, Sr., businessman, owner of coffee and cocoa farms in Liberia. Baptist deacon. Chairman of the True Whig Party. Father of 20 children including William Jr., Frank and Stephen.
- William R. Tolbert Jr. (1913–1980), civil servant and Baptist minister, elected to the House of Representatives (1943–1952), Vice-President (1952–1971), President of Liberia (1971–1980). Assassinated by firing squad in the 1980 Liberian coup d'état.
- Stephen Allen Tolbert (1922–1975), businessman, Liberian civil servant, co-founded of the Mesurado Group, the largest business firm in Liberia. Secretary of Agriculture and Commerce (1950–1956, 1960–1964), Agriculture (1964–1965), Minister of Finance (1972–1975). Killed in a plane crash near Sinoe County.
- Frank E. Tolbert (1910–1980), politician, president pro tempore of the Senate of Liberia. Assassinated by firing squad in the 1980 Liberian coup d'état.
