= Americo-Liberian people =

Ethnic group of Liberia

Total population
- 150,000

Regions with significant populations
- Liberia; United States

Languages
- Liberian English; Liberian Kreyol; Merico

Religion
- Protestantism

Related ethnic groups
- Sierra Leone Creoles, Black Nova Scotians, Gold Coast Euro-Africans, Atlantic Creoles, Afro-Caribbeans and African Americans

Americo-Liberian people (also known as Congo people or Congau people) are a Liberian ethnic group of African American, Afro-Caribbean, and liberated African origin. Americo-Liberians trace their ancestry to free people of color and emancipated African Americans and West Indians who emigrated in the 19th century to become the founders of the state of Liberia. They identified themselves as "Americo-Liberians" as early as the 1850s.

Although the terms "Americo-Liberian" and "Congo" had distinct definitions in the nineteenth century, the title Congo is much broader, encompassing the descendants of the various free-born and formerly enslaved African American, West Indian, recaptive, and Sierra Leone Creoles who settled in Liberia from 1822, particularly those recaptured from the Atlantic Slave Trade by the United States Navy and Royal Navy and settled in Liberia in the mid-19th century.

The designation "Congo" for the Americo-Liberians, though originally an insult, came into common usage much later, even becoming the preferred term for most by the mid-to-late 20th centurty. Liberians integrated Africans liberated from slave ships who were called "Congos" because it was assumed that the slave ships entered the Atlantic from the mouth of the Congo River. Under Americo-Liberian leadership, the country was relatively stable, though the Americo-Liberians and indigenous West Africans maintained largely separate existences and seldom intermarried.

Though indigenous chiefs and royalty could gain representation in government which favored Indirect rule similar to practices and policies throughout colonial Africa, Americo-Liberians led the political, social, cultural, and economic sectors of the country and ruled until 1980 as a small but dominant minority. However, President William Tubman challenged the status quo and championed the cause of indigenous groups in the interior against the established oligarchy.

== History and settlement ==
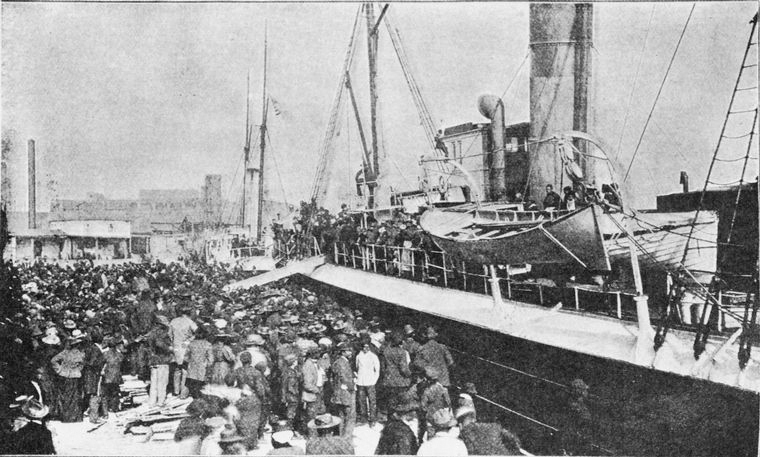
African Americans depart for Liberia, 1896. The American Colonization Society sent its last emigrants to Liberia in 1904.

Americo-Liberians were descended from African American and Afro-Caribbean settlers, many of whom were freed slaves and their descendants who emigrated to Liberia with assistance from the American Colonization Society (ACS). The first black American settlers arrived in Liberia in 1822. The ACS's plan of encouraging black American migration to Africa was met with mixed responses at the time. Some members of the abolitionist movement, such as Gerrit Smith, opposed the idea, arguing that African-American families had lived in the United States for generations, and their prevailing sentiment was that they were no more sub-Saharan African than they perceived White Americans to be European. Other historians have argued that white Americans encouraged the emigration of people of color to Africa due to their opposition to integration. Additionally, some slave owners manumitted some of their slaves on the condition of emigration. However, other African Americans believed they would face better economic opportunities in Africa and be free from racial prejudice, a sentiment that was endorsed by the Back-to-Africa movement. As black American emigration to Liberia continued steadily into the mid to late nineteenth century, the movement gained support from an assortment of influential figures, including UNIA president Marcus Garvey, who would go on to become president of the Black Star Line which encouraged emigration and economic shipping commerce between the United States and Liberia.

The early African-American settlers who arrived in the region that was established as Liberia between 1820 and 1843 were mainly free blacks from Virginia, South Carolina, and Maryland, while smaller numbers came from northern states such as New Jersey, New York, Pennsylvania, Delaware, and Connecticut. Subsequent movements also included emigrants from Mississippi, Louisiana, Arkansas, Kentucky, and Florida.

The Liberian exodus saw mass emigration of African Americans from South Carolina to Liberia. Congressman Richard H. Cain called for a million men to leave the injustices they suffered in the United States and leave for Africa. In 1877, the Liberian Exodus Joint Stock Steamship Company was formed in Charleston, South Carolina with a fund of $6,000 (~$167,145 in 2025) to assist the emigration of black Americans to Africa. The company then purchased a bark called the Azor, which arrived in Charleston in March 1878 to start shipping African American migrants to Liberia. Enthusiasm for the Liberian exodus had been fed partly by exaggerated reports of Liberia's fertility, including claims that potatoes grew so large that a single one could feed a family for a day, and that certain trees produced bacon. However, 23 of the two hundred emigrants died during the journey and upon arrival, the passengers discovered that these claims were not true and many found themselves impoverished. Those who could afford it returned to the U.S. in 1879 and plans for a second voyage by the Liberian Exodus Company were scrapped. However, passengers from the Azor who stayed did find success and established themselves as some of the most prominent Americo-Liberians, including farmer and agricultural businessman Saul Hill, Liberian Senator Reverend David Frazier and Daniel Frank Tolbert, the latter of whom was the grandfather of future Liberian president William Tolbert.

The United States Navy was responsible for the capture of illegal slave vessels seeking to transport enslaved Africans to the Americas following the American abolition of the slave trade in 1808. These rescued Africans, dubbed Liberated Africans or Recaptives, were designated as 'Congoes' as many of them were from the Congo Basin (also the slave ships' point of departure), although the term encompassed others who were from modern-day Nigeria, Cameroon, and Ghana.

Over the course on the 19th century, roughly 20,000 settlers arrived in Liberia, comprising ~14,000 African-Americans and ~5,700 Recaptives. Of the 14,000 African American settlers, nearly half died of malaria in the 10 years after their arrival.

Although the number of Afro-Caribbean immigrants to Liberia was relatively small in comparison to colonial Sierra Leone, at least 300 Afro-Barbadians settled in Liberia in 1865 and smaller numbers of Afro-Caribbean immigrants settled in Liberia between 1865 and 1930 from Caribbean islands such as Trinidad, Jamaica, and Grenada.

The early African American settlers did not relate well to the native African inhabitants they first encountered in Liberia due to cultural differences and soon began to establish a social and economic elite in the country. According to the website BlackPast, "They retained preferences for Western style of dress, Southern plantation-style homes, American food, Protestantism, the English language, and monogamous kinship practices." Demographically, the Americo-Liberians tended to concentrate in larger cities and towns while native Africans remained in more poorly developed areas before the two groups started to intermingle in the twentieth century.

== Development of society ==
The settler community developed an Americo-Liberian society, culture, and political organization that was strongly influenced by their roots in the American South as well as the Anglophone Caribbean.

Americo-Liberians were credited for Liberia's largest and longest economic expansion in the early to late twentieth century, especially William V. S. Tubman, who did much to promote foreign investment and to bridge the economic, social, and political gaps between the descendants of the original settlers and the inhabitants of the interior. Most of the powerful Americo-Liberian families fled to the United States in the 1980s after the last True Whig Party president, William Tolbert, was assassinated in a military coup.

Although Liberianist scholars have neglected internal stratifications such as class and geography among the Americo-Liberian society, regional and local socio-economic differences among the Americo-Liberians resulted in slight cultural differences between rural 'upriver' Americo-Liberians such as those based in Clay-Ashland and city-based Americo-Liberians, particularly those based in Monrovia who were sometimes referred to 'Monrovia Americo-Liberians.' Americo-Liberians based in Monrovia were portrayed as more urbane than their rural counterparts and were perceived by some Americo-Liberians as wielding too great an influence on national political affairs.

== Settlements ==
The Americo-Liberians settled in Monrovia, Careysburg, Clay-Ashland, Buchanan, Maryland, Mississippi-in-Africa, Cape Mount, Greenville, and in a number of small towns along the St. Paul River. Notably, the families originally from Barbados, which included the Barclays, Morgans, Bests, Thorpes, Weeks, and Portemans, settled in Crozierville.

The original "Congo people" were settled in New Georgia. In 1821, the ship Elizabeth from New York landed on Sherbro Island, Sierra Leone with 86 freed African Americans, who were later resettled in Monrovia.

== Political influence in Liberia ==
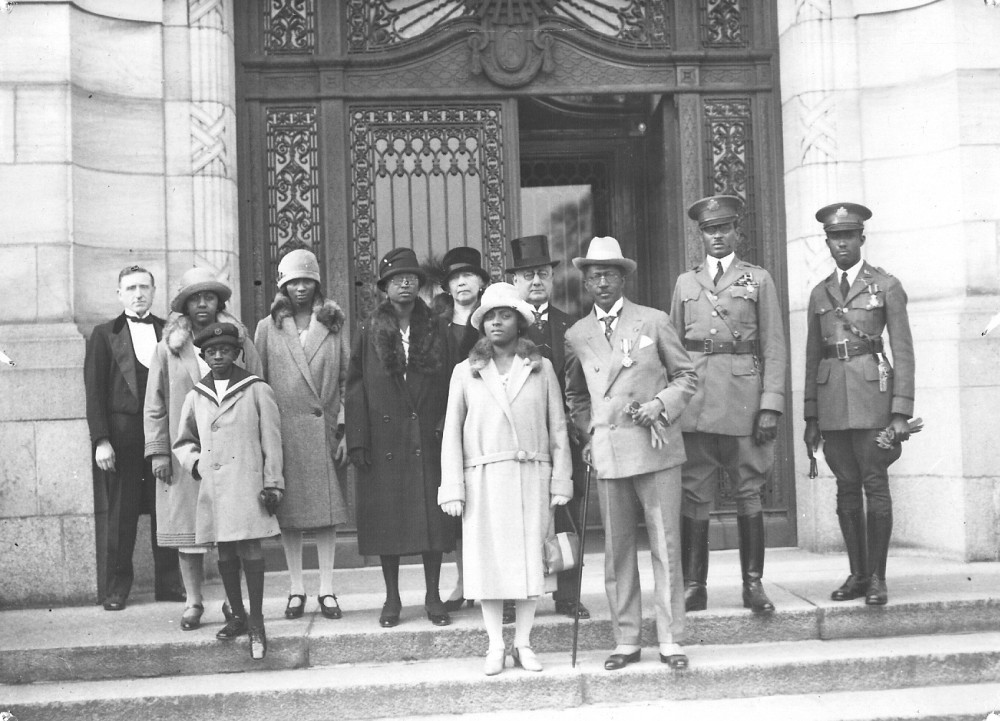
Charles D. B. King, an Americo-Liberian who served as President of Liberia (1920–1930), with his entourage on the steps of the Peace Palace, The Hague (the Netherlands), 1927.

Upper-class Americo-Liberians played a leading role in Liberian national politics from the country's founding. Upon the Liberian Declaration of Independence in 1847, Americo-Liberians controlled much of Liberia's political and social institutions. Political and educational institutions were inspired by United States framework. They established a government system with a constitutional republic and three branches of government (legislative, judicial, executive).

From 1878 to 1980, the Republic of Liberia was a de facto one-party state, ruled by the True Whig Party (TWP) and the Masonic Order of Liberia, which were dominated by Americo-Liberians but later included a minority of Indigenous Liberians, most of whom had been adopted and assimilated into Americo-Liberian families. Liberia was initially dominated by two political parties that were supported by Americo-Liberians, the Republican Party and the TWP.

After TWP candidate Anthony W. Gardner was elected president in 1878, the TWP went on to govern Liberia for over a century, cementing Americo-Liberian political dominance. While opposition parties were never made illegal and Liberia was not classed as a dictatorship, the TWP more or less ran the country as a one party state and held a monopoly on Liberian politics. Liberian presidents from that date onwards were Americo-Liberian with Charles D. B. King being the first and only president of partial Sierre Leone Creole heritage.

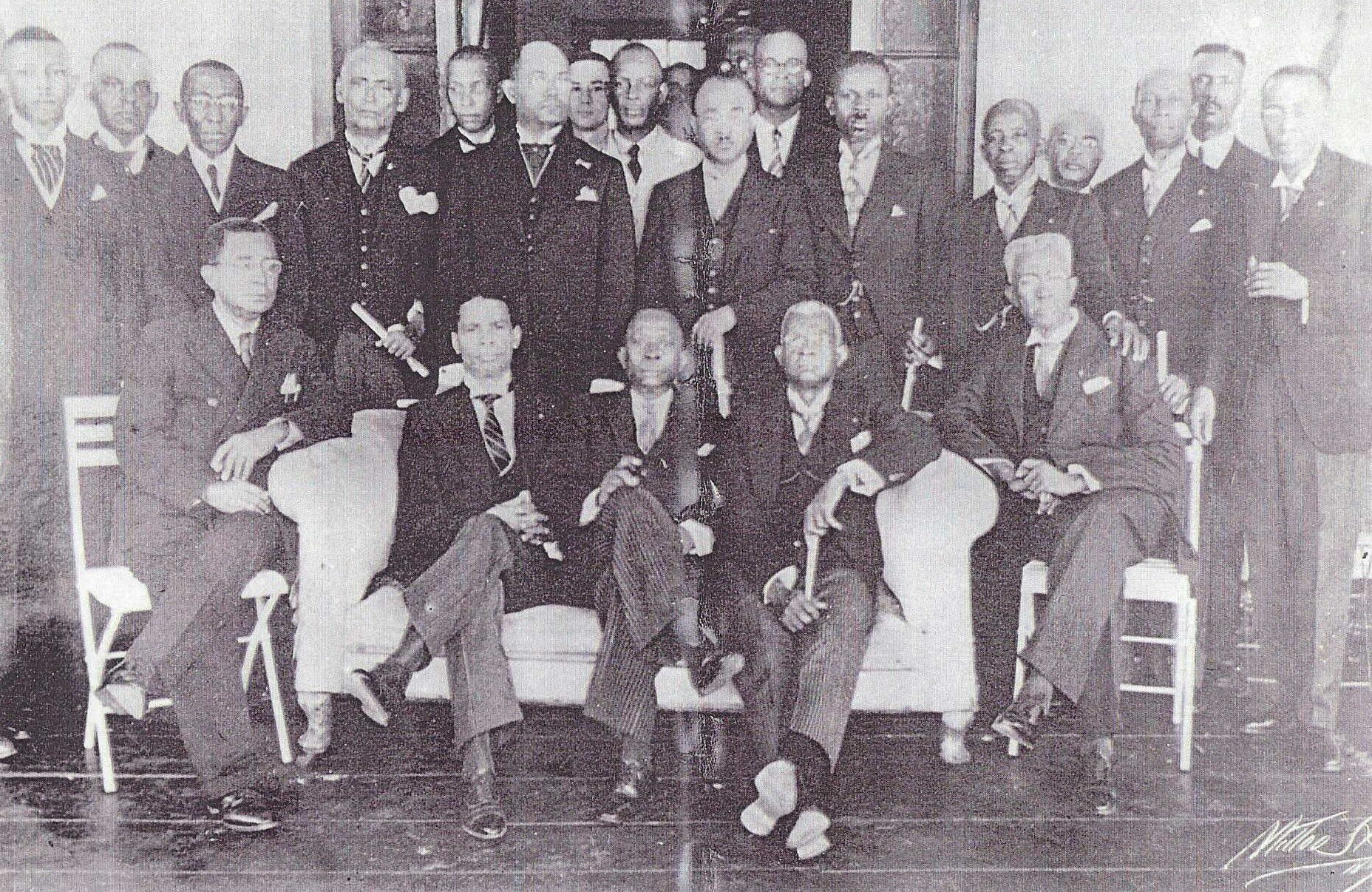
Administration of President William Tubman

Elected as president in 1944, Americo-Liberian William Tubman was widely regarded as the father of modern Liberia. The Tubman administration embarked on a mass modernization program, including improving literacy among the population, agricultural development, updating the nation's infrastructure, courting close relationships with the United States, and attracting foreign investment to stimulate the economy. During his presidency, Liberia usually supported U.S. interests in foreign affairs including cutting off critical ties with Germany to side with the Allied powers and voting with the U.S. at the United Nations on Cold War matters. In return, Tubman secured $280 million in aid from the U.S., the greatest amount to any African country (per capita) at the time.

During his presidency Tubman introduced two major policies: The Open Door Policy and the National Unification Policy. Tubman's Open Door Policy primary goal was to solicit foreign investment, business or allied countries, in Liberia's development. Through this policy Tubman facilitated foreign businesses to locate in Liberia, including major companies such as the Firestone Tire and Rubber Company, the Republic Steel Corporation, and the Liberian American Swedish Mineral Company. The Firestone Tire and Rubber Company proved to be the most influential investment for the Liberian economy as rubber became the major export crop for Liberia. As a result, Liberia experienced a period of rapid development and economic prosperity in the 1960s. He also introduced a National Unification Policy in which he stated his goal to destroy "all ideologies that divide [Liberian people]", and eliminate what he called Americo-Liberianism to replace it with a new societal focus on "justice, equality, fair play, and equal opportunities for all throughout the country." The policy aimed to assimilate interior indigenous Liberians population more fully into the political, economic, and social fabric of Liberia. Tubman also fought for more constitutional rights for indigenous Liberians although disparity still remained.

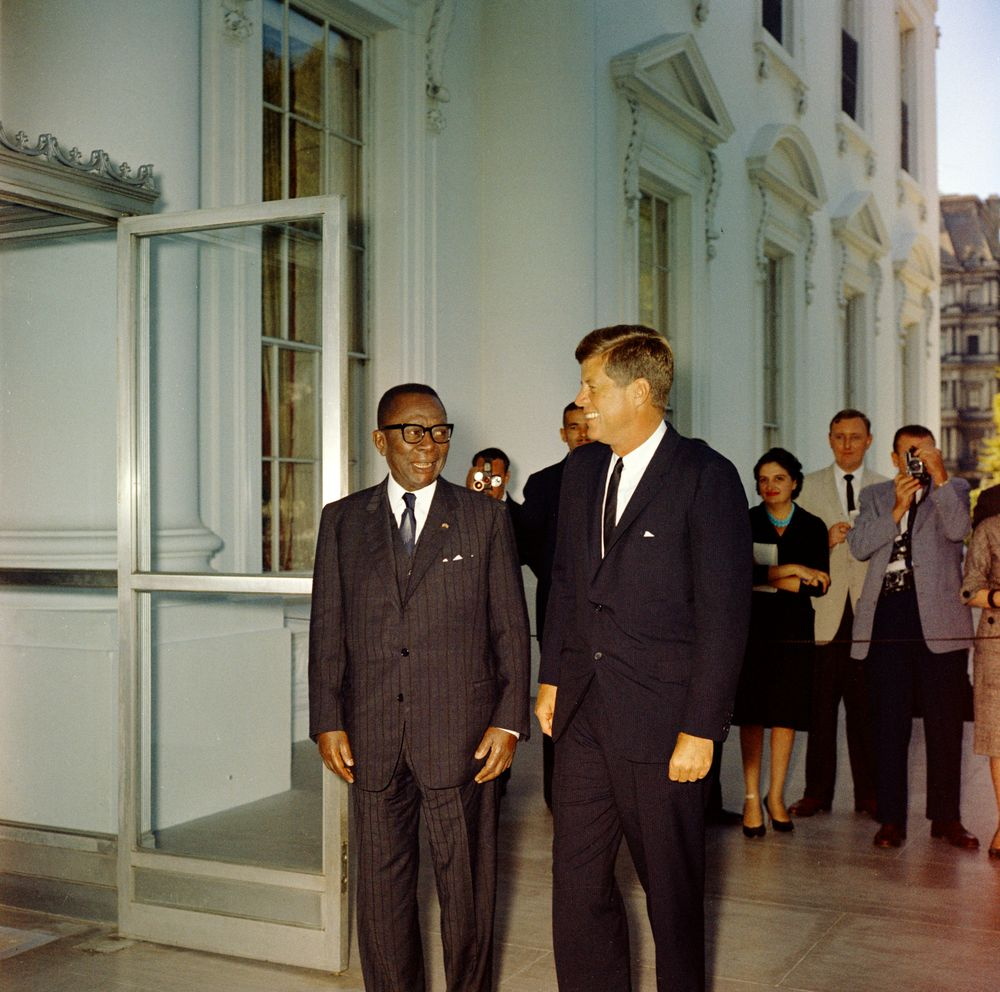
William Tubman and John F. Kennedy at the White House in 1961

Tubman was succeeded by his Vice President, TWP Americo-Liberian William Tolbert in 1971. After coming to power Tolbert sought to introduce more liberal reforms which also included addressing imbalances between Americo-Liberians and the indigenous peoples by bringing more native figures into the government. However, these reforms proved unpopular among some of the Americo-Liberian population (including members of his cabinet) who felt Tolbert was undermining their position and accused him of "letting the peasants into the kitchen", while native Liberians felt the changes were happening too slowly. The U.S.-Liberia relationship also became strained during this time as Tolbert welcomed leaders from communist nations such as China, Cuba, and the Soviet Union. Additionally, he cut ties with U.S. ally Israel during the 1973 Yom Kippur War.

In 1980, Samuel Doe became the first non-Americo-Liberian head of state after he led the 1980 Liberian coup d'état, during which Tolbert was assassinated. Doe's tenure as leader of Liberia led to the destruction of the country's economy and the destabilization of the country, including the political marginalization of Americo-Liberians and eventually the First Liberian Civil War beginning in 1989. By the early 21st century, Liberia had been reduced to being one of the most impoverished nations in the world, with a majority of the population living below the international poverty line.

There is a debate among academics about how upper-class Americo-Liberians were able to exert political power and influence greater than their population. Some academics attribute the influence of the Americo-Liberians to the consolidation of economic and social interests across the various facets of Americo-Liberian society despite the fact that some initial divisions in early Americo-Liberian society were based on state of origin in the United States, educational levels, socio-economic class, free or freedmen status, and perhaps "colorism", particularly because the first president was of mixed race, as were numerous immigrants, reflecting the nature of African-American society in the Upper South.

However, some scholars argue against the importance of colorism in early Americo-Liberian society and have noted, that during the early Republic, the Americo-Liberian political leaders had an array of skin colors and tones from very dark skin to light-skinned phenotypes reflecting African-European admixture, indicating that the theory on the importance of colorism in Americo-Liberian society is unlikely to be accurate.

It is more likely that upper-class Americo-Liberians built their power on their familiarity with American culture and economics, shared lineage, and ability to create a network of shared interests. Others believe their extensive political influence was in part due to the Masonic Order of Liberia, a fraternal organization. A marble Masonic Lodge was built in 1867 as one of Monrovia's most impressive buildings. It was considered a bastion of Americo-Liberian power and was strong enough to survive the civil war. After years of neglect after the war the Masonic order has repaired the lodge.

== Culture ==
Americo-Liberian culture is a blend of the African-American and Caribbean cultures brought to Liberia by the various American, Recaptive, and West Indian settlers and is exhibited by the language, social norms, and architectural style of the Americo-Liberians.

The early African American settlers practiced Christianity, sometimes in combination with traditional African religious beliefs. They spoke an African-American Vernacular English, which developed into Liberian English. English played a central role in education, governance, and communication. The indigenous languages of Liberia are also spoken by various ethnic groups, but English has been the dominant and official language since the arrival of the Americo-Liberian settlers.

Upon arrival the settlers did little to integrate into the existing native practices, instead, they established a society in Liberia that mirrored America's. In addition to modeling their political institutions after the United States, Americo-Liberians were known to prefer Western modes of dress, African-American Southern food, and followed American social norms such as monogamous relationships and class structure. Furthermore, Americo-Liberians contributed to the culinary cuisine of the region by introducing American baking techniques.

The Americo-Liberian settlers built towns and cities with architecture reminiscent of American styles. Churches, buildings, and homes featured a unique form of antebellum architecture and the homes of the elites often resembled American Southern plantation homes. Infrastructure projects, including roads and bridges, were also developed following American models.

Americo-Liberian weddings follow the traditional African-American or Afro-Caribbean style weddings in which the bridegroom appears in a lounge suit and the bride in a white wedding dress.

Many upper-class and influential Americo-Liberians belonged to the Masonic Order of Liberia which was established in 1867 and based in the Grand Masonic Temple in Monrovia. In Liberia, particularly during the early years of the republic, the Masonic Order played a significant role in the political and social structure as it became intertwined with political power and elite networks in Liberia. Being a Mason was a veritable prerequisite for positions of political leadership in the True Whig Party. TWP political meetings were even held in the Grand Masonic Temple, where only members could enter. Following the 1980 Liberian coup, Samuel Doe outlawed Freemasonry before lifting the ban in 1987. The Masonic Temple was damaged during the First Liberian Civil War and remained unoccupied before being restored.

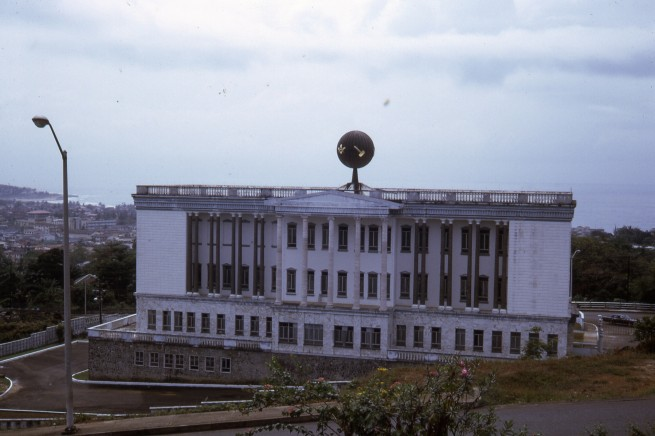
Grand Masonic Temple in Monrovia Prior to the War

== Education ==
The Americo-Liberians arrived with varying degrees of formal and informal education. Americo-Liberians established schools and also established the University of Liberia, formerly Liberia College, in addition to other higher learning institutions such as Cuttington College.

The Americo-Liberians were among the first sub-Saharan Africans to qualify as medical doctors and lawyers in the United States. Prominent Americo-Liberian pioneers include Dr. Solomon Carter Fuller, a distinguished Harvard-educated Liberian psychiatrist and physician.

Several Americo-Liberians worked as teachers and taught both indigenous Liberians and fellow Americo-Liberians. Many Americo-Liberian educators made a concerted effort to educate Liberians from other ethnic groups, including through the use of the ward system.

== Religion ==
The Americo-Liberians are predominantly Protestant Christians and mainly belong to the Baptist and Methodist denominations, although some Americo-Liberians are Episcopalians and perhaps a smaller minority adhere to the Catholic faith. Americo-Liberians introduced Protestant Christianity on a wider scale in the modern-day region of Liberia. Several Americo-Liberians served as missionaries to other ethnic groups in Liberia and were among the first Baptist, Methodist, and Episcopal missionaries of black African descent in Liberia.

== Food ==
Americo-Liberian cuisine includes a variety of dishes and is a blend of African-American, Afro-Caribbean, and local indigenous Liberian rice and foofoo dishes. Americo-Liberians introduced traditional African-American baking techniques into the modern-day nation of Liberia. Liberia remains unique for its baking traditions that are derived from the African-American immigrants to Liberia. Traditional Americo-Liberian cuisine includes African-American soul food such as cornbread, fried chicken, and collard greens but also incorporated local African traditional dishes such as palm butter soup and rice.

== Dress ==
Present-day Americo-Liberians, similar to other Liberians, wear both African and Western-style dress. Ethnic groups in Liberia had been accustomed to seeing European dress prior to the arrival of the Americo-Liberians, as a consequence of extensive trade with Europeans dating to the fifteenth and sixteenth centuries.

However, the ethnic groups who inhabited Liberia did not customarily wear Western-style dress, and it was the Americo-Liberians who popularized Western-style dress including the top hat, tailcoat, lounge suit, and frock coat. Americo-Liberian women between the nineteenth and early twentieth centuries wore elaborate Victorian and Edwardian style American dresses that were fashionable among both the African-American and white American communities in the southern United States. Americo-Liberian men wore top hats, frock coats, and lounge suits in addition to spats.

Although Americo-Liberians would continue to wear elaborate styles of dress for special occasions such as weddings, parades, and the inauguration of presidents, they adapted their styles of dress to incorporate newer Western-style fashion and elaborate African-style dresses between the early to late twentieth centuries. In the modern era, although pioneered by the Americo-Liberians, Liberians, irrespective of ethnicity, wear both African and Western-style dress.

== Language ==
Americo-Liberians speak Liberian English and its varieties such as Merico and Liberian Settler English, all of which have been influenced by African-American Vernacular English, Gullah, and Barbadian Creole. The Americo-Liberians introduced a form of African-American Vernacular English that influenced the existing pidgin English or patois that existed in the region of Liberia from the pre-colonial era. This form, called Standard Liberian English or Liberian Settler English, continues to be spoken by descendants of the original settlers today.

== Architecture ==
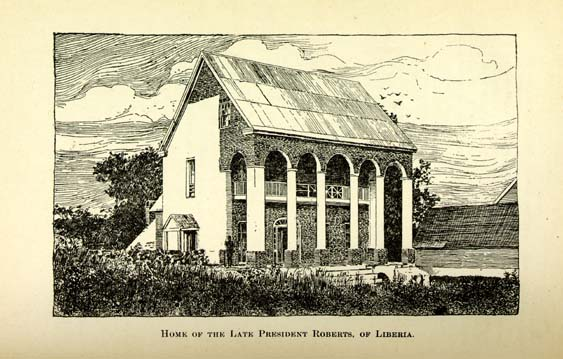
Lithograph of the former home of Joseph Jenkins Roberts in Monrovia

Americo-Liberian architecture in the nineteenth and early twentieth centuries was a unique fusion of antebellum architecture from the United States blended into the African environment of Liberia. Americo-Liberian houses were a variation of different architectural styles from the American South and were built of weather-board or stone frame and had both verandahs.

Wealthier Americo-Liberians incorporated antebellum southern architecture that included neoclassical and the neo-Greco-Roman architecture of the antebellum southern plantation great houses into the houses that they built in Liberia. Antebellum southern architecture incorporated Georgian, Neoclassical, and Greek Revival styles that are also reflected in Americo-Liberian architecture of the nineteenth and early twentieth centuries.

== Diaspora and legacy ==
=== Americo-Liberian diaspora ===
Following the 1980 Liberian coup d'état and the First and the Second Liberian Civil Wars, thousands of Americo-Liberians left the country while others were killed in the conflicts. The 1980 coup brought an end to the dominant political position that Americo-Liberians had held on Liberian society and resulted in influential Americo-Liberian individuals and families leaving the country either by being forced or voluntarily going into exile. The higher socio-economic status of Americo-Liberians also enabled them to emigrate from the country more easily compared to other ethnic groups during times of conflict. In 1991, American President George H. W. Bush granted Liberians immigration protection under "temporary protected status" during the first civil war. Americo-Liberians have settled predominantly in the United States in places such as Maryland, Minnesota, New York, Pennsylvania, as well as in smaller numbers in Canada and the United Kingdom. Some of the children of Americo-Liberian immigrants to the United States are known to identify themselves as African-American as opposed to Liberian and have adopted American accents and culture. Although the Americo-Liberian diaspora is extensive in the United States, there remain communities of Americo-Liberians in the larger Liberian cities and towns such as Monrovia, Crozerville, and Careysburg. In 2009, it was estimated that a population of 150,000 Americo-Liberians existed within the total Liberian population of 3.5 million people.

=== Americo-Liberian cultural legacy ===
While globalization has carried African-American culture around the world, Americo-Liberians reproduced their own cultural American continuity in Liberia. Its name means "land of the free", and it is considered the most American of African countries in terms of its political institutions.

The Liberian constitution, structure of government, and flag resemble those of the United States. The former residences of Americo-Liberian families were built in the style of antebellum plantation homes they may have admired in the American South. Their language continued to carry elements of African-American Vernacular English. By many accounts, Liberians easily integrate into African-American communities. Liberian immigrants to the United States have the highest passport acceptance rates and the longest extension rates of any citizens of African nations.

Although many of the upper-class Americo-Liberians left the country or were killed during the civil wars, and their houses and monuments crumbled, ordinary Liberians look to the United States for aid. In 2007, BET founder Robert Johnson called for "African Americans to support Liberia like Jewish Americans support Israel".

== Notable Americo-Liberians ==
The Americo-Liberian or Congau ethnic group has produced several notable politicians, businessmen, and professionals including:

=== Politicians ===
- Wilmot Collins, Liberian-born American politician serving as the mayor of Helena, Montana
- William V.S. Tubman, Liberian President and father of modern Liberia
- William Tolbert, Last True Whig Party President
- Nathaniel Barnes, Liberian businessman and politician
- Charles Cecil Dennis, Liberian diplomat and politician
- C. Cyvette M. Gibson, Mayor of Paynesville, Liberia
- Louis Arthur Grimes, Liberian jurist
- Richard Abrom Henries, Liberian politician
- Elijah Johnson, Liberian pioneer and founding father of Liberia
- James A. A. Pierre, Liberian politician
- Charles Taylor, convicted war criminal and last Americo-Liberian President
- Hilary Teage, Liberian pioneer and author of the Liberian Declaration of Independence
- Frank E. Tolbert, Liberian politician and businessman
- E. Reginald Townsend, Liberian politician and journalist
- Winston Tubman, Liberian lawyer and politician
- Clarence Lorenzo Simpson Sr., Liberian politician and former Vice President
- Kimmie Weeks, Liberian human rights activist

=== Education and writers ===
- Edward Wilmot Blyden, Liberian intellectual scholar and Pan-Africanist pioneer
- Mary Antoinette Brown-Sherman, Liberian educator and first African woman to serve as president of a university
- Anna E. Cooper, educator, dean of the University of Liberia
- Helene Cooper, journalist for The New York Times
- John Payne Jackson, influential journalist in the Lagos Colony and founder of the Lagos Weekly Record
- Wayétu Moore, author

=== Business ===
- Romeo A. Horton, a founder of the Africa Development Bank
- Clarence Lorenzo Simpson Jr., Liberian judge and businessman
- Benoni Urey, Liberian businessman and the wealthiest Liberian
- Rhoda Weeks-Brown, General counsel to the IMF

=== Science and medicine ===
- Solomon Carter Fuller, Liberian pioneer and African-American psychiatrist and physician

=== American-born presidents of Liberia ===
Americo-Liberians formed a cultural elite in Liberia. The following presidents of Liberia were born in the United States:

- Joseph Jenkins Roberts, first and seventh president; born in Norfolk, Virginia
- Stephen Allen Benson, second president; born in Cambridge, Maryland
- Daniel Bashiel Warner, third president; born in Baltimore County, Maryland
- James Spriggs-Payne, fourth and eighth president; born in Richmond, Virginia
- Edward James Roye, fifth president; born in Newark, Ohio.
- James Skivring Smith, sixth president; born in Charleston, South Carolina
- Anthony W. Gardner, ninth president; born in Southampton County, Virginia
- Alfred Francis Russell, tenth president; born in Lexington, Kentucky
- William D. Coleman, thirteenth president; born near Lexington in Fayette County, Kentucky
- Garretson W. Gibson, fourteenth president; born in Baltimore, Maryland

One Americo-Liberian president of Liberia was born in the British West Indies; Arthur Barclay, the fifteenth president of Liberia, was born in Bridgetown, Barbados. The eleventh, twelfth, sixteenth and all subsequent presidents were born in Liberia.

== See also ==
- African-American diaspora
- African Americans in Africa
- History of Liberia
- Liberian nationality law
- Martin Delany
- McGill family (Monrovia)
- Mississippi-in-Africa
- Sierra Leone Creole people
- Back-to-Africa movement
- Atlantic Creole
- Creole peoples
- Gold Coast Euro-Africans
