= Thomas Quiwonkpa =

Liberian general (1940–1985)

- Born: 25 July 1940; Nimba County, Liberia
- Died: 15 November 1985 (aged 45) Monrovia, Liberia
- Allegiance: Liberia
- Branch: Liberian Armed Forces
- Rank: Major general

Thomas Gankama-Quiwonkpa (27 July 1940 – 15 November 1985) was a Liberian military officer who was a Commanding General of the Armed Forces of Liberia (AFL).

Quiwonkpa joined the AFL as a teenager and came to prominence during the 1980 Liberian coup d'état, in which he assisted Samuel Doe in overthrowing President William Tolbert and ending 133 years of Americo-Liberian rule. He then became part of Doe's People's Redemption Council junta where he was promoted to Major general. In 1983, he was purged by Doe after being suspected of plotting a coup, forcing him to flee into exile. In 1985, he led an unsuccessful coup against Doe, in which he was killed and reported partially cannibalized by Doe loyalists.

== Biography ==
Born in the town of Zualay in 1940, Quiwonkpa was the son of subsistence farmers. At the age of sixteen, he joined the AFL. After finishing high school in 1958 through a programme at the Barclay Training Center, he received an assignment to the AFL's records department.

=== Part of Samuel Doe's coup (1980) ===
He came to prominence on 12 April 1980, when he assisted Samuel Doe in a military coup that overthrew the Americo-Liberian government of William R. Tolbert, Jr. About a month later, the revolutionaries arrested AFL commander-in-chief Edwin Lloyd and other military leaders on charges of planning a counter-coup. By mid-May, Quiwonkpa was proclaimed a major general and made the new AFL commander.

Two months later he was using the title of brigadier general. Before long, he fell out with Doe; in 1983, Quiwonkpa was demoted and subsequently charged with an attempt to overthrow the Doe administration, forcing him to flee the country.

=== Coup attempt against Doe (1985) ===
On 12 November 1985, one month after elections were held, Quiwonkpa, supported by about two dozen heavily armed men, covertly entered Liberia through Sierra Leone, and launched a coup against Doe. However, Quiwonkpa's unorthodox methods and lack of support from the United States resulted in a disastrous failure.

Quiwonkpa was captured and on 15 November was killed and mutilated by Krahn soldiers loyal to Doe. His killers then dismembered his body and reportedly ate parts of it. His body was publicly exhibited on the grounds of the Executive Mansion in Monrovia soon after his death.

Joe Wylie, later deputy minister of defense in the NTGL, was among the group who launched the coup.

=== Post-coup attempt reprisals ===
In a campaign of retribution against the coup plotters and their supporters, Doe's government launched a bloody purge against the Gio and Mano ethnic groups in Quiwonkpa's Nimba County, raising alarm about a possible genocide. Doe's slaughter of an estimated 3,000 people provoked ethnic rivalries that later fuelled the First Liberian Civil War.
