= E. Reginald Townsend =

Liberian politician

National Chairman, True Whig Party
- In office October 27, 1979 – April 22, 1980
- Preceded by: James Anderson

Minister of State for Presidential Affairs
- In office 1972–1979
- Succeeded by: D. Elwood Dunn

Minister of Information, Cultural Affairs, and Tourism
- In office 1965–1971
- Succeeded by: G. Henry Andrews

Personal details
- Born: July 23, 1917 Schieffelin, Marshall Territory, Liberia
- Died: April 22, 1980 Monrovia, Liberia
- Education: Michigan State College; American University; Liberia College

Edison Reginald Townsend (July 23, 1917 – April 22, 1980) was a Liberian journalist and statesman known for the establishment of Liberia's Information Services. He served as Secretary of Information and Cultural Affairs under President William Tubman, and as Minister of State for Presidential Affairs under President William Tolbert. In 1979 he was elected National Chairman of the True Whig Party. Following the 1980 Liberian coup d'état of President Tolbert on April 12, 1980, he and several other members of the Tolbert administration were put on trial and without due process executed by firing squad on April 22, 1980.

== Early life and education ==
Edison Reginald “Reggie” Townsend was born in Schieffelin, Marshall Territory, Liberia; the fifth of seven children to Edward and Annie Townsend née Walker. His grandparents immigrated to Liberia from the United States and from Barbados in the 1800s. Townsend's early education began at Lott Carey Mission in Brewerville, Liberia, then at Liberia College High School. He earned the opportunity to travel to the United States to continue his studies; first at the American University in Washington, D.C. from 1950-1952, and then at Michigan State College in East Lansing, Michigan where he received an M.A. in Journalism. After completing his studies and returning to Liberia, Townsend began working as a journalist, and in 1954 was selected to be Press Secretary to President William Tubman.

== Civil servant and statesman ==
As Press Secretary, Townsend prepared speeches for the president, oversaw and edited presidential papers for publishing, and accompanied the president on state visits. He realized the need for a public medium and suggested to President Tubman the need to develop and improve information services in the country. President Tubman supported this endeavor and subsequently appointed him Chief of the Information Bureau at the Department of State (1955–1958). During his services at the Information Bureau, Townsend implemented an effective medium to keep the people of Liberia informed about their government and its affairs, and domestic and international news at home and abroad. He went on to become Director of the Liberian Information Service (LIS) (1958–1964), following an act establishing it by the Liberian Legislature. Under Townsend's leadership, Liberia's information services greatly expanded providing print media and on-air radio and television broadcasting, which boosted tourism and appreciation of the Liberian culture. In 1960 the formation of the Liberian Broadcasting Corporation (ELBC) was established, followed by the establishment of television services (ELTV) in 1964. In 1965, President Tubman named him Secretary of the Department of Information and Cultural Affairs, and later elevated the position to cabinet level.

In 1963, along with Deputy for Cultural Affairs, Bai T. Moore, Townsend led the founding of the National Cultural Center with the strong backing of President Tubman. Moore and Townsend worked steadfastly together with the many tribal liaisons throughout the country to develop Liberia's National Cultural Center at Kendejah, Marshall Territory. President Tubman opened the Center in 1964, which was described as a “panorama of tribal life, customs and traditions with thirty-one tribal huts and palava kitchens, designed and built by master builders from Liberia's 16 major tribes.” The goal of the Center was to project the cultural image of the country, encourage and improve indigenous arts and crafts, provide a base for the National Cultural Troupe, and preserve the country's traditional art forms. Following the coup d'état in 1980, the operations and activities of the Center were not maintained, and as a result of the civil wars in the early 1990s the facilities suffered damage and fell into disrepair. Many of its occupants became dislocated and fled. The facilities were subsequently removed, and the land converted to commercial use and today is occupied by the Robert L. Johnson Kendeja Resort and Villas.

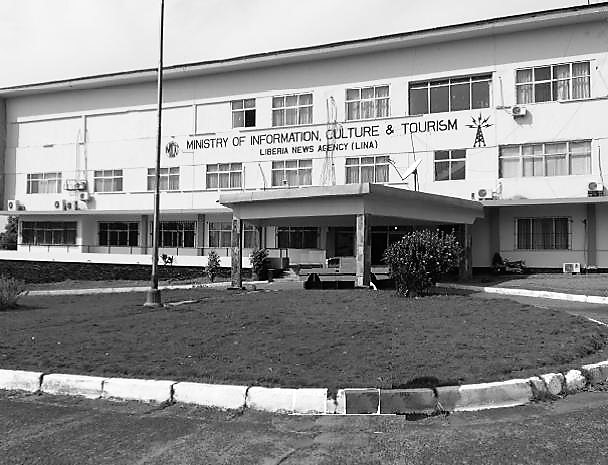
Ministry of Information, Cultural Affairs, and Tourism

When William R. Tolbert was elected President of Liberia, he appointed Townsend Minister of State for Presidential Affairs (1972–1979). In this role, Townsend directed and oversaw the office of the president, assisted in the administration and affairs of the cabinet, ensured the goals and agenda set forth by the president and cabinet progressed and were achieved, oversaw the development of presidential speeches, and acted on behalf of the president in his absence. Townsend along with then Foreign Minister Cecil Dennis helped lead the planning, coordination, and support for the Government of Liberia's hosting of the 32nd Summit of the Organization of African Unity in 1979.

In April 1979, Townsend was voted in as the 16th National Chairman of the True Whig Party of Liberia, the ruling party of the era. His selection came amidst a time when the party was struggling to transition from one that had a history of dominance by Americo-Liberians to one that needed to broaden its membership base to be inclusive of all members of Liberian society, including indigenous tribes. Known for his uncanny ability to bridge differences between various parties, Townsend won overwhelming approval to lead the party into this next phase. President Tolbert lauded his selection as he too had a partner to help with his “mats to mattresses” and signature “Rally Time” movement to raise the living standards of all Liberians.

== Other involvement ==
Townsend was an active member of the Presbyterian Church of Liberia and was ordained Moderator of the Presbytery of Liberia in November 1977. He was the first layperson ever to have been elevated to Moderator since the founding of the church in Liberia in 1833. Townsend was also a freemason and an active member of the Grand Lodge of the Masonic Order of Liberia. In late 1979 he was selected as the Thirty-Second Grand Master of the Grand Lodge of Masons 33.

== Coup d’etat and death ==
On April 12, 1980, President Tolbert was overthrown and executed by militants headed by master sergeant Samuel Doe and some enlisted men of the Liberian Army. Townsend and nearly all of Tolbert's cabinet ministers and some members of the True Whig Party were charged with “high treason, rampant corruption, misuse of public office and gross violation of the civil and human rights of the Liberian people.” Without due legal process they were found guilty and summarily sentenced to death and executed by firing squad at Barclay Beach in Monrovia on April 22, 1980, ten days after the overthrow of Tolbert. Besides Townsend, the following government officials were executed: Frank E. Tolbert, brother of President William Tolbert and President Pro-Temp of the Liberian Senate; Cecil Dennis, Minister of Foreign Affairs; Cyril Bright, former Minister of Planning and Economic Affairs; Chief Justice James A. A. Pierre; Richard Abrom Henries, Speaker of the House of Representatives; Frank J. Stewart, Sr, Director of the Budget; John W. Sherman, Assistant Minister of Commerce and Trade; P. Clarence Parker II, Chairman of the National Investment Council and Treasurer of the True Whig Party; James T. Phillips, former Minister of Finance and former Minister of Agriculture; David Franklin Neal, former Minister of Planning and Economic Affairs; Joseph J. Chesson, Sr, Minister of Justice; and Charles T. O. King, Deputy Minister for Agriculture.

== Personal ==
E. Reginald Townsend was married twice; first to Sophronia Richards, and then to Evelyn Diggs. At the time of his untimely death in 1980 he was survived by his widow, seven children, and many members of his extended family.

== Selected works ==
- President Tubman of Liberia Speaks (LIS, 1959)
- Proverbs of Liberia: Vai, Gola, Grebo (LIS, 1963)
- Liberia: Open Door to Travel and Investment (MICAT, 1967)
- The Official Papers of William V. S. Tubman, President of Liberia (MICAT, 1969)
