= Clarence Lorenzo Simpson Jr. =

Liberian jurist

Clarence Lorenzo Simpson Jr. (1933–2016) was a Liberian jurist and politician. He served as Associate Justice of the Supreme Court, Attorney General, and Minister of Justice of Liberia serving under both President William Tubman and President William Tolbert.

== Early life ==
Clarence Lorenzo Simpson Jr, an Americo-Liberian was born in Liberia to Clarence Lorenzo Simpson, Sr. and Abrametta Stubblefield Simpson on June 15, 1933. Clarence Lorenzo Simpson, his father served as Vice President and Secretary of State in Liberia. Clarence Lorenzo Simpson Sr. was the grandchild of John Simpson, a Florida-born ex-slave and Julia Ann Simpson, née Russell, a daughter of President Alfred Francis Russell. The Simpson clan is one of the most influential Americo-Liberian families in Liberia.

Counselor Simpson received his high school diploma from Williston Academy in Easthampton, Massachusetts. After this he enrolled at the University of Massachusetts, Amherst, Massachusetts. He later took the LLB degree from Georgetown University in Washington, D.C.

Following his return home with a law degree, Mr. Simpson, son of President Tubman’s first vice president Clarence Lorenzo Simpson, was appointed Legal Counsel of the Ministry of Public Works.

== Religious life ==
Like many in the Simpson clan, Counselor Simpson was a devout Christian and member of the Episcopal Church of Liberia. He served as Chancellor of the Episcopal Diocese. He also served under Bishop Dillard Houston Brown, representing the Episcopal Diocese on the Board of Trustees of Phoebe Hospital, which later became a School of Nursing. After relinquishing the Chancellorship, he continued to Act as an informal advisor to the Diocese. He made constant financial and spiritual donations to the church and its members throughout the longevity of his life.

== Political career ==
Counselor Simpson's started his political career following his return to Liberia after obtaining his law degree from Georgetown University. Counselor Simpson began his career in public service as a Lecturer at the Louis Arthur Grimes School of Law, University of Liberia. Later in his career he was appointed Legal Counsel of the Ministry of Public Works. He served in many capacities of trust with distinction in the private and public sectors and also played key roles in many critical negotiations, most especially the Mount Coffee Hydro Electric Dam Project and National Highway Projects, funded by the United States and German Governments.

In recognition of his vital role and remarkable performance, he was appointed at age 31, youngest to serve at this position in Liberian history at this time, by President William V. S. Tubman as Associate Justice of Supreme Court of Liberia in 1966. He also served on the Supreme Court Bench under Chief Justice A. Dash Wilson and remained in said position until 1971 when he was appointed by the late President William R. Tolbert, Jr. as Attorney General and Minister of Justice. Counselor Simpson was also the General Secretary of the True Whig Party. In consideration of his noble, devoted and dedicated services to the Liberian Government, and excellent Legal skills demonstrated, the late Chief Justice Johnnie N. Lewis in 2006 again appointed him as Chairman, Grievance and Ethic Committee of the Supreme Court of Liberia.
