= Executive Mansion, Monrovia =

Official residence and workplace of the President of Liberia

Executive Mansion
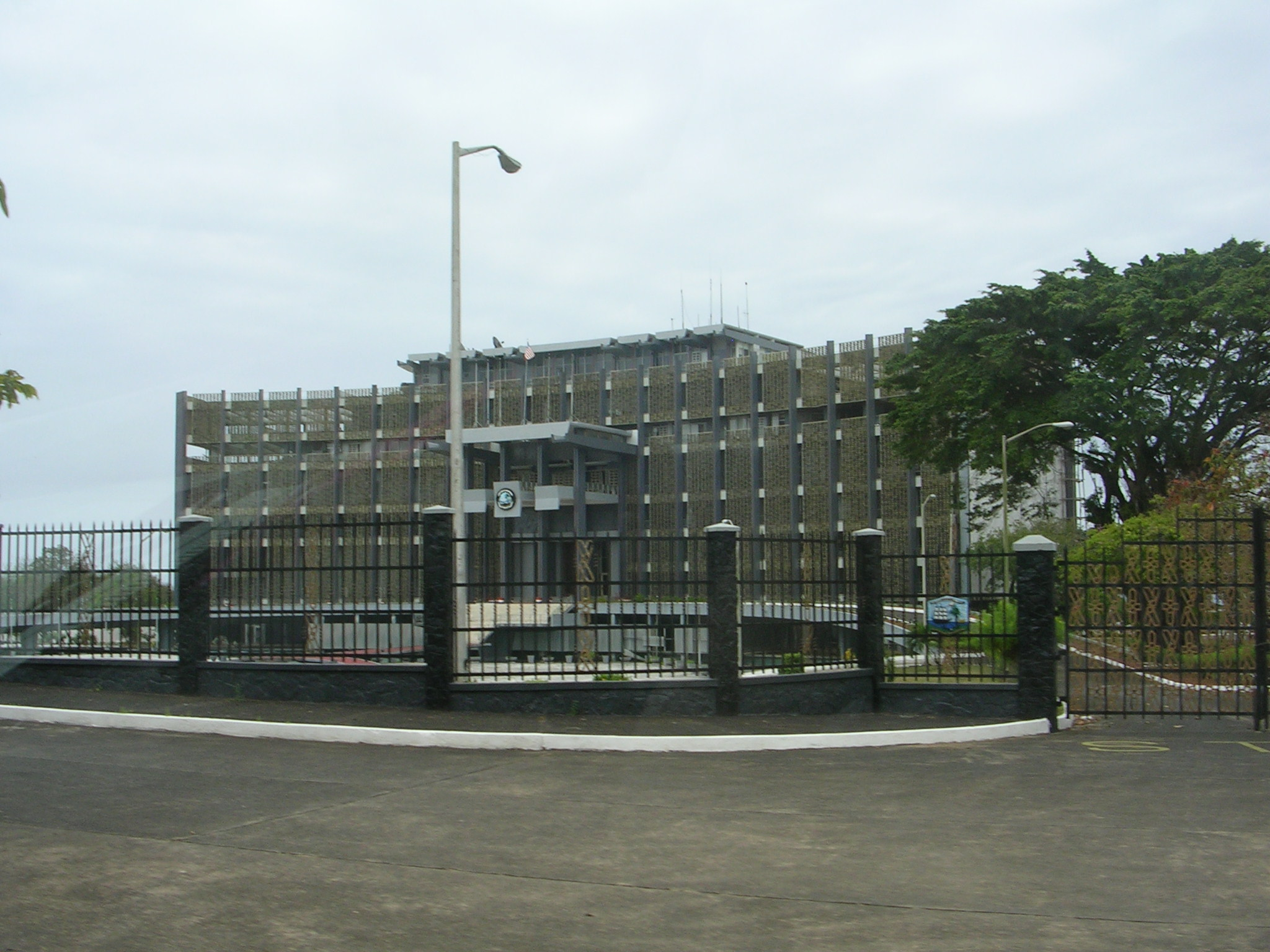
- Executive Mansion in 2009.

- Location within Liberia

General information
- Status: In use
- Type: Presidential palace
- Location: Capitol Hill district, Monrovia, Liberia
- Coordinates: 6.3003°N 10.7983°W
- Current tenants: President Joseph Boakai
- Construction started: 1961
- Completed: 1964
- Client: William Tubman
- Owner: Government of Liberia

Technical details
- Floor count: 8

Design and construction
- Known for: Official residence of the president of Liberia

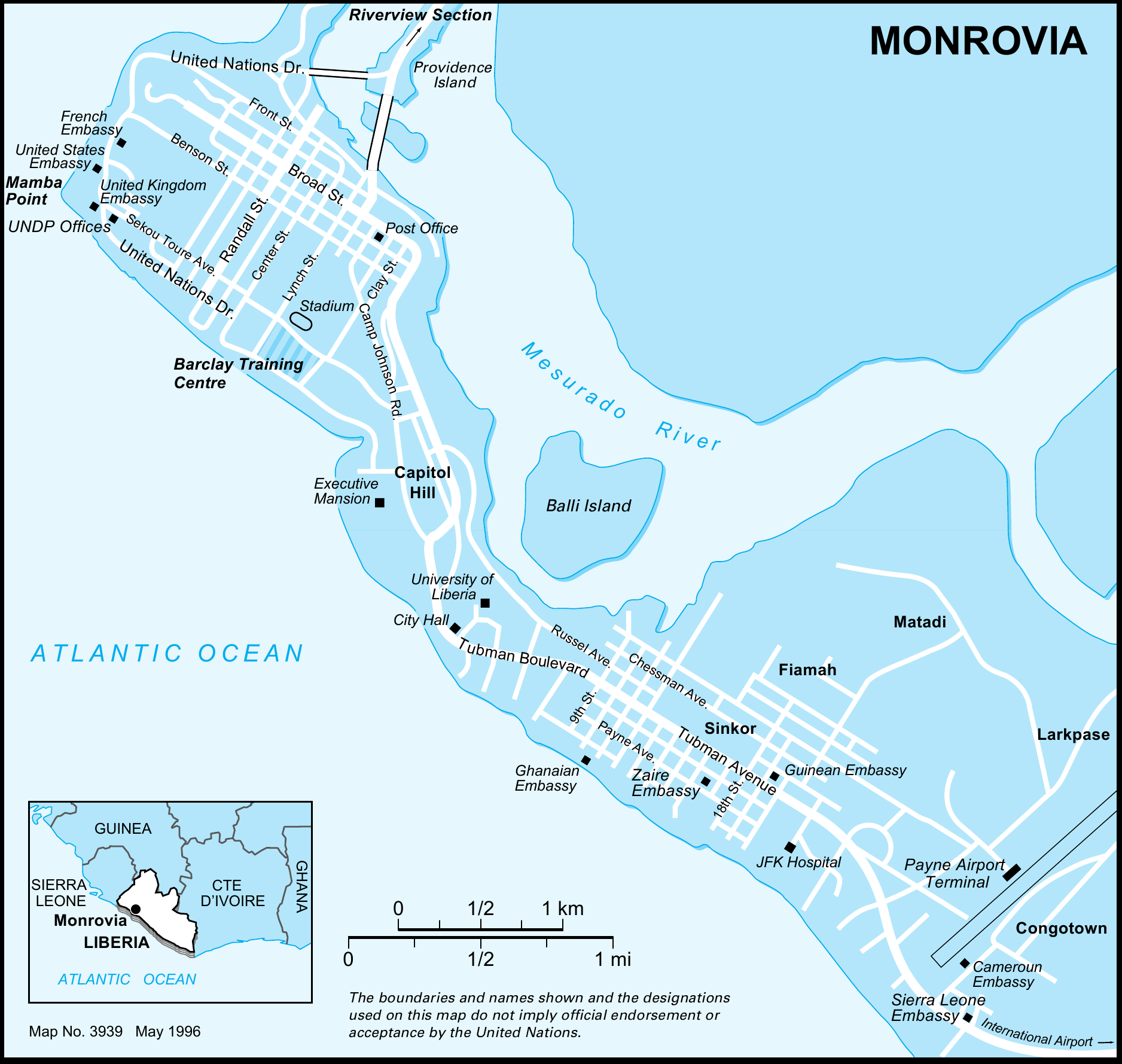
A 1999 UN map of Monrovia, showing the location of the Executive Mansion.

The Executive Mansion of Liberia is the official residence and workplace of the country's president. Located across the street from the Capitol Building in the Capitol Hill district of Monrovia, the current building was constructed during the presidency of William Tubman, which lasted from 1944 to 1971. The construction started in 1961, and was completed in 1964.

The Executive Mansion was the scene of the murder of Tubman's successor, President William Tolbert (in office 1971–1980), during the 1980 coup d'état.

According to public hearings of the Truth and Reconciliation Commission (TRC), blood ritual and other sacrifices were performed at the Executive Mansion during the presidency of Samuel Doe, which lasted from 1980 to 1990. They were meant to render the president as well as the Executive Mansion impregnable. Hundreds of people, especially men, are also said to have been killed on the grounds of the Executive Mansion in the wake of the failed coup attempt by Thomas Quiwonkpa in 1985.

The Executive Mansion was destroyed by fire on July 26, 2006, during the 159th anniversary celebration of the adoption of the Liberian Declaration of Independence. President Ellen Johnson Sirleaf (in office 2006–2018) was at the time feting foreign guests and dignitaries in the gardens of the Executive Mansion. On February 14, 2022, the Executive Mansion was reopened.

== Gallery ==
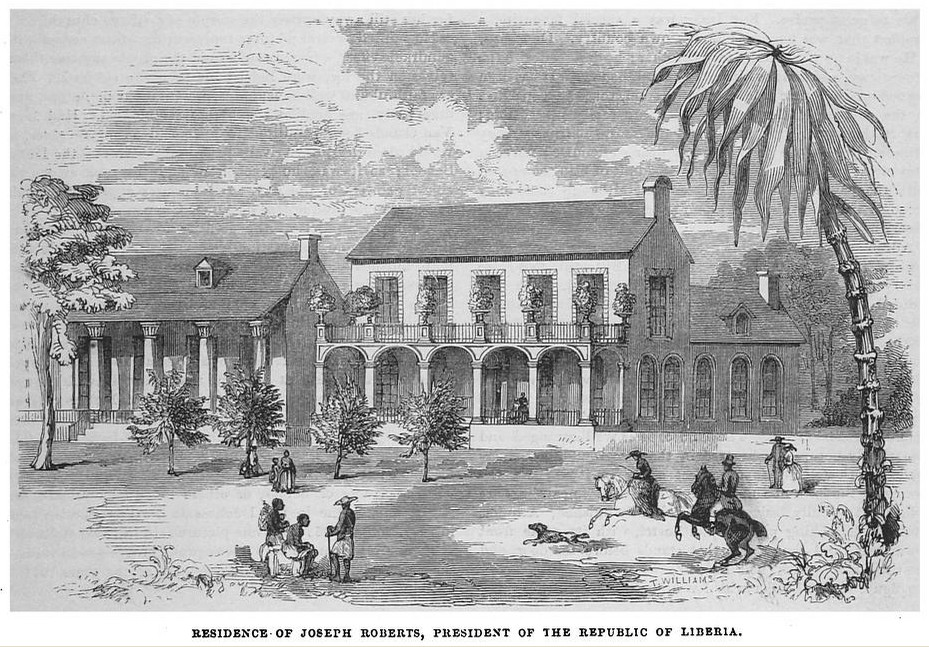
Residence of Joseph Jenkins Roberts, first president of Liberia, between 1848 and 1852.

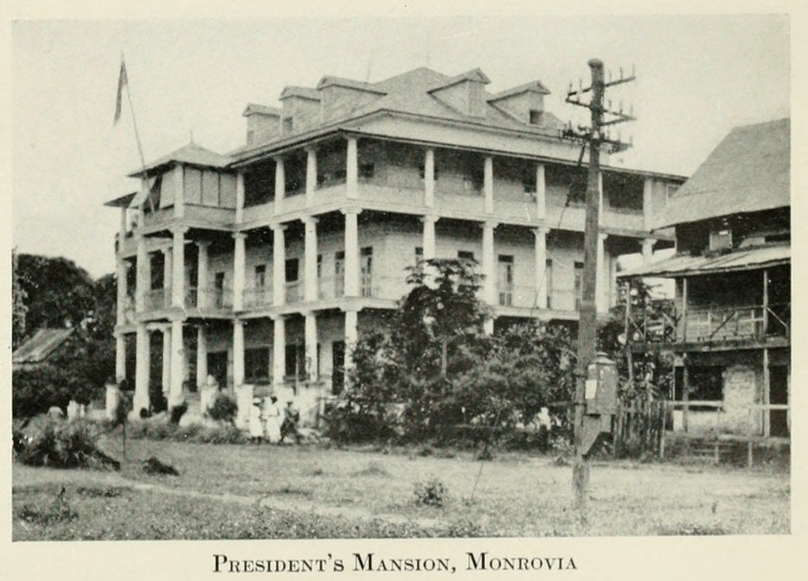
Old Executive Mansion, between 1910 and 1920.

== See also ==
- Timeline of Monrovia
