= Victoria Tolbert =

First Lady of Liberia

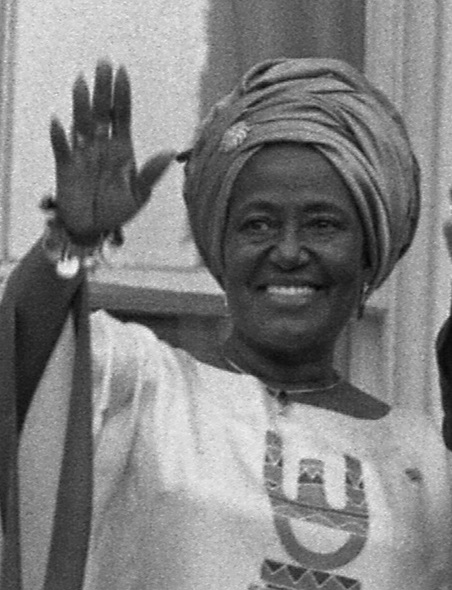

First Lady of Liberia
- In office 23 July 1971 – 12 April 1980
- President: William Tolbert
- Preceded by: Antoinette Tubman
- Succeeded by: Nancy Doe

Personal details
- Born: Victoria Anna David; 12 July 1916 Robertsport, Liberia
- Died: November 1997 (aged 81) Plymouth, Minnesota, U.S.
- Resting place: Kensico Cemetery; Valhalla, New York, U.S.
- Spouse: William Tolbert (m. 1936; died 1980)

Victoria Anna David Tolbert (née David; 12 July 1916 – November 1997) was the First Lady of Liberia from 1971 to 1980.

== Early life and education ==
Victoria Anna David was born on 12 July 1916 in Robertsport, Grand Cape Mount County, Liberia. Her father, Isaac David, was an American immigrant from Little Rock, Arkansas. Her mother, Rosaline Houston was a native Liberian of Vai ethnicity. Victoria was given a basic education by the Episcopal missionary Margarita S. Ridgely at the House of Bethany. Victoria later trained to become an elementary school teacher. She started teaching kindergarten at a mission school in 1934, and it was there she met William Tolbert.

== Marriage ==
Victoria married William Tolbert on 12 May 1936 in Robertsport. Not long after the marriage, the couple moved to Bensonville, where she continued her work as a teacher, and William began working as a government paymaster. In 1951, William was elected as Vice President of Liberia. In July 1971, upon the death of President William Tubman, William Tolbert became President of Liberia. As first lady, Victoria initiated the fundraiser known as the Annual Calendar Tea. The fundraiser was held on 19 November, in honor of former President Tubman's birthday, and raised money for poor children's scholarships. In 1972, Victoria joined her husband during his visit to Guinea to preside over the interment of the late Ghanaian leader Kwame Nkrumah. Victoria and William had eight children together.

== Widowhood and death ==
President Tolbert was killed in the coup d'état on 12 April 1980. Following the coup, Victoria was imprisoned and then put under house arrest for months by Samuel Doe's regime. Victoria was ultimately freed and allowed to leave for the United States. In the United States, she lived in White Plains, New York, for a time before moving to Plymouth, Minnesota, with one of her daughters. In 1996, Tolbert released a book she wrote entitled Lifted Up: The Victoria Tolbert Story. In November 1997, Victoria died of a heart attack in Plymouth. Sources are inconsistent on the exact date of her death. The New York Times printed that she died on 8 November, while the Associated Press printed that she died on 9 November. She was interred at Kensico Cemetery in Valhalla, New York.
