= 1985 Liberian coup attempt =

1985 coup attempt in Liberia

1985 Liberian coup d'état attempt
Date	12 November 1985
Location	Monrovia, Liberia
Result	Coup attempt failed.

Belligerents
Liberia	(Liberia) AFL coup plotters (Liberia) NPFL; Alleged support: Libya

Commanders and leaders
(Liberia) Samuel Doe	(Liberia) Gen. Thomas Quiwonkpa (executed)

Strength
Unknown	500–600

The 1985 Liberian coup d'état attempt was staged by General Thomas Quiwonkpa, who had been a leader of the 1980 coup along with President Samuel Doe and later founder of the National Patriotic Front of Liberia (NPFL). On 12 November 1985, one month after elections were held, Quiwonkpa, supported by about two dozen heavily armed men, covertly entered Liberia through Sierra Leone, and launched a coup against Doe. The coup resulted in a disastrous failure and Quiwonkpa was captured and on November 15 was killed and mutilated by Krahn soldiers loyal to Doe, who reportedly ate parts of his body.

Samuel Doe also announced in a radio and television broadcast that anyone found on the streets after a 6 p.m. curfew would be considered a rebel and executed immediately.

Following the coup attempt, Doe's forces massacred thousands of civilians in retaliation.
