= Clarence Lorenzo Simpson =

Liberian politician

Clarence Lorenzo Simpson Sr.
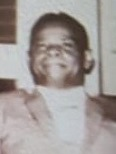
- Born: 1896
- Died: 1969 (aged 72–73)
- Occupation: Politician

Clarence Lorenzo Simpson Sr. (1896–1969) was a Liberian politician who served as the 22nd vice president and the speaker of the House of Representatives. He served also as Secretary of State during much of World War II (1934–1943) under President Edwin Barclay, and later as Liberia's ambassador to the United States.

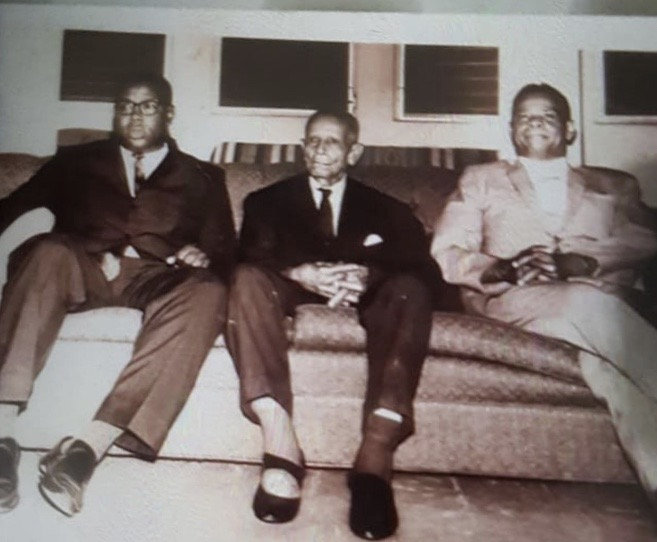
Simpson (right), Alpha D. Simpson (center), Clarence Lorenzo Simpson Jr. (left)

== Early life ==
Clarence Lorenzo Simpson was born in Liberia to Alpha D. Simpson, an Americo-Liberian and Kamah Gray, a Vai woman who was the grand-daughter of the Great Vai King Long Peter from Grand Cape Mount, Liberia. Alpha D. Simpson was a son of John Simpson, who was born in slavery in Florida, and Julia Ann Simpson, née Russell, a daughter of Liberian President Alfred Francis Russell.

== Political career ==
Before becoming Secretary of State, Simpson had served as Post Master General and Speaker of the Liberian House of Representatives from 1931 to 1934. After leaving the Department of State in 1943, Simpson was one of the six candidates in that year's election. He lost to William Tubman. He served as the Vice President of Liberia from 1944 to 1952 under Tubman.

Simpson was the Liberian delegate to the League of Nations in 1934 and headed the Liberian delegation to the United Nations in 1945.

Simpson also held the following positions: Ambassador to the Court of St. James, London, England; Ambassador to the United States, Washington, D.C.; Grand Master of Masons, Republic of Liberia, and Head of the National True Whig Party of Liberia, a political party that ruled Liberia for over 100 years.

== Autobiography ==
Simpson, Clarence L. The Memoirs of C.L. Simpson: The Symbol of Liberia. London: Diplomatic Press and Pub. Co, 1980. OCLC 18830080

== Personal life ==
Clarence Simpson was married and had several children including Hilaria Simpson-Adams, Clarice Simpson-Abdallah, Clarence Lorenzo Simpson Jr. and Amanda Simpson.

== Sources ==
- New Liberian Ambassador, Her Only One, Lands Here Today To Take Up Post In U.S. The New York Times, 20 April 1952

Political offices
Preceded by Louis Arthur Grimes	Secretary of State of Liberia; 1934–1943	Succeeded by Gabriel Lafayette Dennis
Preceded by James Skivring Smith Jr.	Vice President of Liberia; 1944–1952	Succeeded by William Richard Tolbert Jr.
