= Nancy Doe =

First Lady of Liberia from 1980 to 1990

First Lady of Liberia
- In office 12 April 1980 – 9 September 1990
- President: Samuel Doe
- Preceded by: Victoria Tolbert
- Succeeded by: Jewel Taylor

Personal details
- Born: 1949 Zwedru, Liberia
- Died: 21 May 2025 (aged 76) Monrovia, Liberia
- Spouse: Samuel Doe (died 1990)

Nancy Bohn Doe (1949 – 21 May 2025) was the first lady of Liberia from 1980 to 1990.

== Biography ==
Doe was born in 1949 in Zwedru, Grand Gedeh County. She moved to Monrovia in the 1960s, where she worked as a merchant. She married Samuel Doe, who was in the Liberian Armed Forces, in either 1968 or 1969. Together, they had four children. After Samuel gained control of Liberia in the 1980 coup d'état, Doe became first lady. As first lady, she established a national market women's association. The Nancy B. Doe Market, in Jorkpeh Town, Sinkor, was established in her honor. In June 1983, during a visit to the United States, Doe helped establish scholarship opportunities for Liberian students at Chicago State University.

After her husband Samuel was executed in 1990, and the First Liberian Civil War began, Doe went into exile. She returned to Liberia after the second civil war, sometime before 2005. On 12 November 2016, Doe filed a lawsuit against the Liberian government to the ECOWAS Court, claiming the government denied her access to the bank accounts of her deceased husband. In 2019, the court ruled in favor of Doe, ordering the government to pay Doe a sum of $18 million (~$21.7 million in 2024) U.S. dollars. As of 2020, Doe was yet to be paid the money ordered by the court. Also in 2020, Doe called for her husband to be given a state reburial.

Doe died at her residence Monrovia, Liberia, on 21 May 2025, at the age of 76.
