= William Wardsworth =

Liberian jurist

William E. Wardsworth was a Liberian jurist in the 20th century. Born in 1898, he held a range of political positions during his life, starting as a Justice of the Peace in Montserrado County. After serving in multiple administrative positions in Careysburg and the hinterland, he took office as a judge in Marshall Territory before his elevation to the Supreme Court.

Wardsworth died in office on 24 February 1977 after a short illness, having checked himself into the Catholic hospital in Sinkor on the previous day. He was survived by his wife, two sons, and a daughter.
