= Stephen A. Tolbert =

Liberian politician (1921–1975)

Minister of Finance
- In office 1972 – April 29, 1975
- President: William Tolbert
- Succeeded by: Edwin Williams

Personal details
- Born: February 16, 1921 Bensonville, Liberia
- Died: April 29, 1975 (aged 54) Greenville, Liberia
- Education: Liberia College; University of Michigan

Stephen Allen Tolbert (February 16, 1921 – April 29, 1975) was a Liberian politician and businessman.

== Early life ==
Tolbert was born on February 16, 1921, in Bensonville, Liberia, the younger brother of William Tolbert. Tolbert received a high-school education from Liberia College and in 1941 received a B.A. from the institution. That same year, Tolbert held a chief position at the Division of Passports, and did so until 1943. In 1944, he furthered his education in the United States, first by attending Howard University, then the University of Michigan, where he received a B.S. and M.S. in forestry.

== Career ==
Tolbert served as chief of the division of forestry for the Liberian Department of Agriculture from 1948 to 1949. He then served as assistant secretary of agriculture from 1949 to 1957. He served as director of the school of forestry for the University of Liberia for two years, starting in 1959, before serving as the secretary of agriculture and commerce from 1960 to 1965.

Tolbert, with his brother and the vice president of Liberia William, founded the Mesurado Group of Companies, the first Liberian-owned multimillion-dollar company. It was a fishing enterprise, which expanded its scope as time went on. Tolbert established similar enterprises in Sierra Leone and Nigeria. In 1969, Tolbert got into the shrimping industry. Other business interests of his included partial ownership of the Bank of Liberia as well as a diamond-exporting firm known as the Liberian American Mining Company.

In 1972, Tolbert was appointed minister of finance. He resigned from his position at the Mesurado Group of Companies to accept this cabinet appointment. His appointment was controversial, as his brother was now president, and Tolbert's position was attained in large part due to this relation. Journalist Albert Porte criticized Tolbert for using his public office to advance his business interest in the Mesurado Group of Companies in a 1974 broadside entitled Liberianization or Gobbling Business?. Tolbert sued Porte on the charge of libel for a substantial sum of money, and while Tolbert won the suit, the outcry against the ruling led the founding of the first civil society organization in Liberia.

== Death ==
On April 29, 1975, Tolbert as well as five other associates died in a plane crash after shortly after taking off from Greenville, Liberia, to attend a meeting.
