= James Edward Greene =

Liberian politician

James Edward Greene (6 July 1914 – 22 July 1977) was a Liberian politician from Greenville, Sinoe County. He served as the country's 24th vice president from April 1972 until his death on 22 July 1977.

Political offices
Preceded by William Richard Tolbert Jr.	Vice President of Liberia; 1972–1977	Succeeded by Bennie Dee Warner
