= Antoinette Tubman =

First Lady of Liberia (1914–2011)

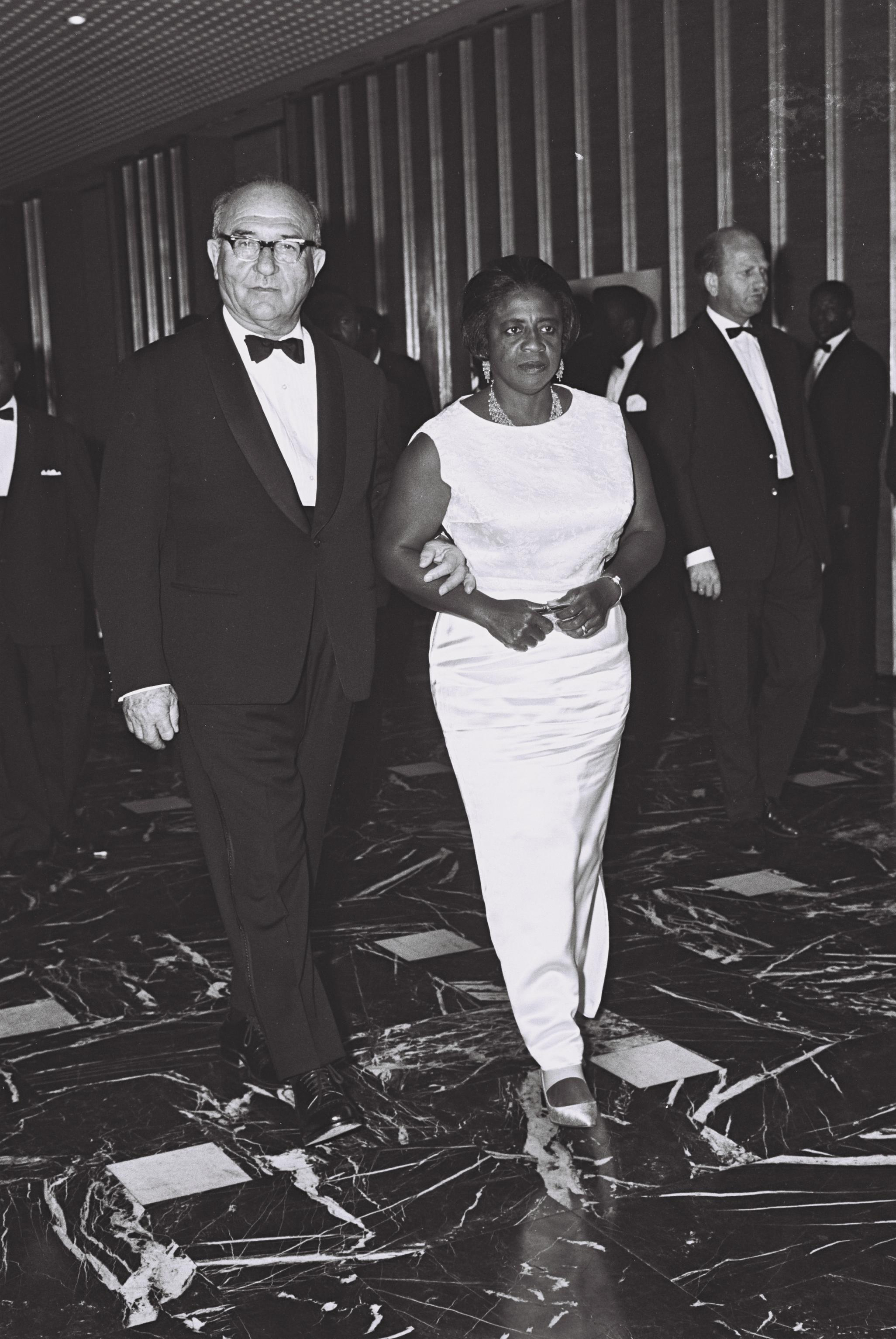

First Lady of Liberia
- In office 17 September 1948 – 23 July 1971
- President: William Tubman
- Preceded by: Euphemia Barclay
- Succeeded by: Victoria Tolbert

Personal details
- Born: Antoinette Louise Padmore; 24 February 1914 Monrovia, Liberia
- Died: 18 May 2011 (aged 97) Monrovia, Liberia
- Spouse: William Tubman (1948–1971; his death)
- Children: 1

Antoinette Louise Padmore Tubman (24 February 1914 – 18 May 2011) was the wife of the Liberian politician William S. Tubman and the First Lady of Liberia from 1948 to 1971.

== Biography ==
Antoinette Padmore was born in Monrovia on 24 February 1914. Her parents were James Stanley Padmore and Mary Louise Barclay-Padmore, who had both emigrated from Barbados. Her mother died when she was young, as a result she was brought up by her aunt Elizabeth Barclay-Sherman. She was educated at Bromley Mission, an episcopal school, then moved to Paris to study fashion. On her return she opened the first school of fashion and modelling in Monrovia. She married William Tubman on 17 September 1948. She was his third wife. They had one daughter, Wilhemina Tubman-Tucker.

== Work as First Lady ==
Tubman was First Lady of Liberia from her marriage in 1948 to the death of her husband in 1971. In the Executive Mansion she set up a museum with artefacts relating to her husband's presidency as well as previous ones. More significantly, Tubman used her influential role as First Lady raise funds and awareness for philanthropic and humanitarian causes, including: orphans, the homeless, the mentally ill. In August 1957, a new orphanage funded by the Antoinette Tubman Children's Welfare Foundation was opened in Virginia. In 1958 she set up a charity dedicated to fund-raising for a new hospital for the mentally ill in Monrovia. She was president of the Social Services Association. She was noted for her involvement in political life.

After her husband's death in July 1971, his estimated fortune of $220 million (~$1.3 billion in 2024) made her one of the richest women in the world. She established the William V S Tubman Memorial Museum on their estate, east of Monrovia in Totota, based on the collection she founded early in their marriage.

As well as being First Lady, Tubman also ran two businesses: a motel and restaurant called Coocoo's Nest; a plantation and roasters called Wilmetco Coffee.

She died on 18 May 2011. She was buried on 11 June 2011 at the United Methodist Church, Monrovia.

== Legacy ==
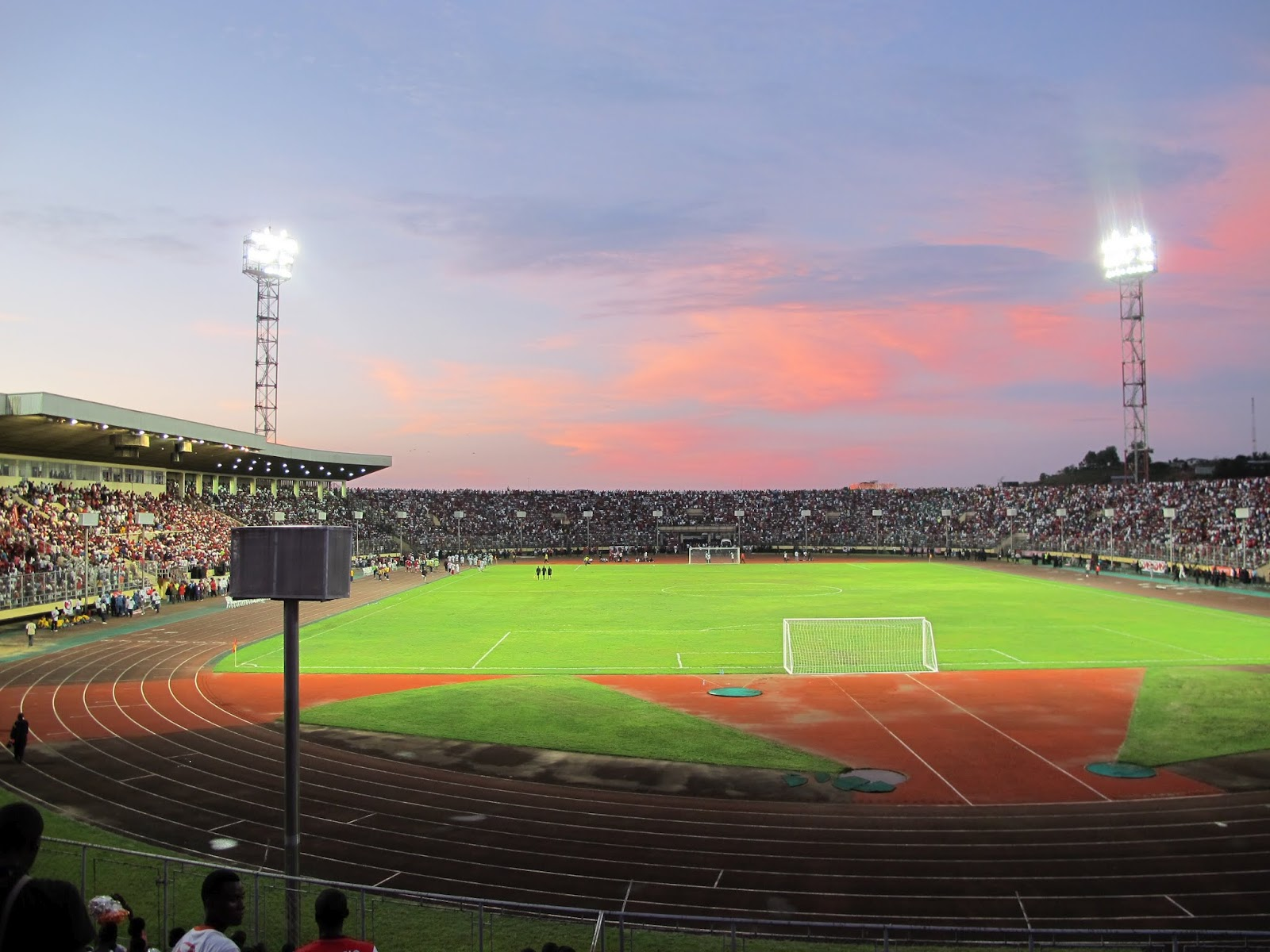
Antoinette Tubman Stadium, Monrovia

The sports stadium in Monrovia was named the Antoinette Tubman Stadium in her honor.

== Awards ==
1956 - Grand Cross of the Order of Merit of the Federal Republic of Germany.
