= Vivienne Newton Gray =

American educator

- Vivienne Newton Gray, from a 1946 newspaper
- Born: Vivienne E. Newton; February 24, 1917; Teague, Texas, U.S.
- Died: November 25, 1988 (age 71); Marshall, Texas, U.S.
- Occupation(s): Teacher, social worker, Methodist missionary
- Known for: Missionary teacher in Liberia, 1948 to 1974
- Relatives: Bennie Dee Warner (foster son)

Vivienne E. Newton Gray (February 24, 1917 – November 25, 1988) was an American educator and social worker. She was a Methodist missionary teacher in Liberia from 1948 to 1974. She was also an administrator at Wiley College in Texas.

== Early life and education ==
Newton was born in Teague, Texas, the daughter of Andrew John Newton and Della Gibson Newton. Her father was a Methodist minister. She graduated from Wiley College, and earned a master's degree from Gammon Theological Seminary in Atlanta. She was a member of Delta Sigma Theta. She pursued further studies at Cornell University and the Boston University School of Theology.

== Career ==
As a young woman, Gray was a member of the Women's Division of Christian Service staff of the United Methodist Church, working on projects in Wisconsin and Florida. In Liberia, Gray founded and ran a school at Gbarnga, and taught adult literacy and public health classes. She was named Liberia Teacher of the Year for 1968. She and her husband received the Liberian Star medal in 1974, for their services in Liberia.

Gray was director of admissions and alumni affairs at Wiley College in her later years. She frequently spoke at Methodist meetings and at women's club gatherings.

== Personal life ==
Newton married a fellow Gammon Theological Seminary alumnus and missionary, Ulysses Samuel Gray Sr. They had two children, and several foster children in Liberia, including Bennie Dee Warner, who became vice president of Liberia in 1977. She died in 1988, at the age of 71, at her home in Marshall, Texas.
