= Florence Chenoweth =

Liberian politician and United Nations officer (1945–2023)

- Born: Florence Alletta Chenoweth; 2 April 1945; Robertsport, Liberia
- Died: 26 June 2023 (aged 78)
- Occupation: Agriculturalist
- Years active: 50
- Known for: First female minister of agriculture in Africa; role in promoting food security

Florence Alletta Chenoweth (2 April 1945 – 26 June 2023) was a Liberian politician and agriculture and food security specialist. As minister of agriculture in Liberia, she was the first woman to hold such a position in Africa. She also held several senior posts with the United Nations Food and Agriculture Organization (FAO).

== Early career ==
Chenoweth was born in Robertsport, Liberia. She received a BSc. from the University of Liberia in 1967 and earned a Master’s degree in agricultural economics from the University of Wisconsin–Madison in the United States in 1970. Returning to Liberia she had various jobs in the Ministry of Agriculture until 1977, when she was appointed Liberia's minister of agriculture. She was the first woman to serve as a minister of agriculture in Africa and at the time was the only female minister of agriculture anywhere. Attending the biennial FAO Conference for ministers of agriculture at FAO Headquarters in Rome, she encountered difficulties during an official visit by the ministers to the Vatican. She was briefly denied entry, being told by the guards that “it is not for wives”.

== Departure from Liberia ==
On 14 April 1979, Monrovia, the capital of Liberia, experienced significant rioting that left around 40 people dead and US$35 million of property damage. Although the riots appeared to have been politically manipulated, the initial cause was a decision by President William Tolbert, on the advice of Chenoweth, to increase the price of rice. Rice was a major drain on foreign reserves and Chenoweth argued that raising the price would encourage local rice farmers to increase production and promote self‐sufficiency. However, not only was rice a major component of the Liberian urban diet but the President was a major rice farmer and opposition leaders argued that the price was being increased just to benefit him.

The rice riots can be seen as a factor leading to the coup d'état one year later when Samuel Doe seized power. Tolbert was killed during the coup on 12 April and 13 members of the Administration, including the deputy minister of agriculture, were executed ten days later. Warned for her own safety, Chenoweth spent three months hiding in a closet in her home. She eventually escaped and walked her children to safety in Sierra Leone, before they made their way to the United States.

After arriving in the United States she worked for the World Bank, first in Zambia and then in Washington, D.C. In 1986 she obtained a PhD in land resources, again from the University of Wisconsin-Madison, with a dissertation on “Small Farmers’ Response to Economic Incentives: A Case Study of Small Farmers in Liberia”. In 1995 she joined FAO as its representative in The Gambia. Subsequently she opened FAO's first office in South Africa following the end of apartheid. In 2001, she was put in charge of FAO liaison with the United Nations in New York, a post she filled until 2007.

== Return to Liberia ==
In 2009 Chenoweth began a second term as agriculture minister in Liberia, holding the post until resigning in 2015. In January 2013 she was suspended from office for one month by the President, Ellen Johnson Sirleaf, following a scandal related to the corrupt issuance of forestry permits. Although not alleged to have personally profited, Chenoweth was accused of having failed to provide proper oversight and due diligence in the issuance of permits. During her tenure she implemented a “Back to the Soil” campaign in Liberia to empower rural female farmers, which had success in increasing rice and cassava production.

Chenoweth died on 26 June 2023, at the age of 78, after suffering from Alzheimer's disease.

== Awards ==
- Florence Chenoweth was awarded an Honorary Degree by her alma mater, the University of Wisconsin–Madison, following a semester-long appointment in 2007 as a distinguished international visitor. The university noted her “inspiring activist work to alleviate world hunger”. She was given a Distinguished Alumni Award by the university in 2005.
- The Hunger Project named her as its Africa Prize laureate in 2011 for improving the livelihoods of women farmers. She promoted domestic food production in Liberia, where many people are undernourished.
- She was a Vital Voices and Bank of America Global Ambassador.
