= Harrison Pennoh =

Liberian rebel

Harrison Pennoh is best known for allegedly killing then-President of Liberia William Tolbert on 12 April 1980.

== 1980 coup d'état ==
In 1979, hundreds of protesters marched through the streets of Liberia's capital, Monrovia, demonstrating against the sharp rise in the price of rice. Tolbert ordered his troops to fire on the demonstrators, and approximately seventy people were killed. Despite efforts to restore order, rioting ensued throughout Liberia, and attempts to quash the opposition by arresting its leaders failed. On 12 April 1980, Tolbert was overthrown by military mutineers in a coup d'état where the 66-year-old President was savagely murdered by private soldier Harrison Pennoh, who later proved mentally unstable. Before the end of the month, Tolbert's entire Cabinet had been put on trial and sentenced to death — with no right to be defended by a lawyer and no right to appeal to the verdict. All but one were publicly executed on a beach near Monrovia. The only cabinet members who escaped from being shot were the only minister of tribal origin, raised in an Americo-Liberian family that was part of the Tolbert-clan Ellen Johnson Sirleaf and the Minister of National Security Burleigh Holder, who was imprisoned at the notorious Belle Yalla prison in Lofa County.
