= 1980 Liberian coup d'état =

Military overthrow and execution of President William Tolbert

- Date: April 12, 1980
- Location: Monrovia, Liberia
- Type: Military coup
- Cause: Ethnic tensions between Americo-Liberians and indigenous Liberians
- Motive: Regime change
- Target: Executive Mansion, Monrovia
- Organised by: Samuel Doe
- Participants: 17 members of the Armed Forces (NCOs and soldiers)
- Outcome: Coup succeeds: William Tolbert is overthrown and executed.; Thirteen members of the Tolbert administration are executed on 22 April 1980.; The People's Redemption Council is established by Samuel Doe to rule the country.; First Liberian Civil War begins.

The 1980 Liberian coup d'état happened on April 12, 1980, when President William Tolbert of Liberia was overthrown and murdered in a violent coup. The coup was staged by an indigenous Liberian faction of the Armed Forces of Liberia (AFL) under the command of Master Sergeant Samuel Doe. Following a period of transition, Doe ruled Liberia throughout the 1980s, until his murder in 1990 during the First Liberian Civil War.

== Background ==
Historians have argued that a series of complex events led to the coup of 1980, the first of which was the imbalance of power between the native population of Liberia and the Americo-Liberians. The Americo-Liberians were descended from African-American (and a minority of Afro-Caribbean) settlers, some of whom were freed slaves and their descendants who emigrated to Liberia with assistance from the American Colonization Society (ACS). The Americo-Liberian settlers did not relate well to the indigenous peoples they encountered and following Liberian Declaration of Independence in 1847, they held an elite position over society while native tribes lived within poorly developed rural communities.

Over time, the two communities did start to integrate and intermingled but in the decades prior to the coup, Americo-Liberians still controlled much of Liberia's political institutions (despite making up a smaller percentage of the total ethnic population) and were reluctant to cede power to the natives at the time. A majority of Liberian presidents were of Americo-Liberian descent and belonged to the True Whig Party (TWP). While opposition parties were never banned, the TWP effectively governed the country as a one-party state. Although Liberia saw a period of economic prosperity in the 1960s and rapid development, there was still a disparity between the Americo-Liberians and the natives. After coming to power in 1971, William Tolbert sought to address imbalances and introduce liberal reforms including recognizing opposition groups. However, Tolbert was also accused of using nepotism and corruption to retain power which fueled opposition to the government. Tolbert's administration also introduced unpopular agricultural reforms which were opposed by many sections of Liberian society and led to riots in 1979. Following the riots and the Maryland ritual killings, Tolbert called for the imprisonment of opposition leaders.

== Events ==
In the early hours of April 12, 1980, 17 non-commissioned officers (NCOs) and soldiers of the AFL led by Master Sergeant Samuel Doe launched a violent coup d'état. All of the conspirators were indigenous Liberians, while Tolbert belonged to Americo-Liberians. The group entered the Executive Mansion (presidential palace) and killed Tolbert, whose body was dumped into a mass grave together with 27 other victims of the coup. It is reported that Harrison Pennoh was the person that killed Tolbert. Accounts have differed on where Tolbert was killed. In his book, Mask of Anarchy, Steven Ellis claimed the President was found sleeping in his office, where Doe's men shot him, while Ellen Johnson Sirleaf's biography, This Child Will Be Great says Tolbert was seized and killed in his bed. Between April 21 and April 28, a crowd of angry Liberians gathered to shout insults and throw rocks at Tolbert's corpse after he was buried in a mass grave.

== Aftermath ==
The coup brought an end to over a century of Americo-Liberian political dominance and after assuming power, Doe became the first native Liberian president to govern the country.

Members of Tolbert's family were killed or detained following the coup. One of his sons, A. Benedict Tolbert tried to take refuge in the French Embassy but was arrested by members of Doe's security force who violated diplomatic immunity, and reportedly he was thrown out of a military aircraft while being transported to a prison in Lofa County. Tolbert's widow Victoria was briefly placed under house arrest before leaving the country and subsequently lived in exile in the United States until her death in 1997.

By the end of April 1980, most of the cabinet members of the Tolbert administration had been put on trial in a kangaroo court and sentenced to death. Thirteen of them were publicly executed by firing squad on April 22 at a beach near the Barclay Training Center in Monrovia. The executed were:

- Frank E. Tolbert — brother of the president and President pro tempore of the Senate
- Richard A. Henries — Speaker of the House of Representatives
- E. Reginald Townsend — National Chairman of the True Whig Party
- P. Clarence Parker II — Chairman of the National Investment Council and Treasurer of the True Whig Party
- James A. A. Pierre — Chief Justice of the Supreme Court
- Joseph J. Chesson Sr. — Minister of Justice
- Cecil Dennis — Minister of Foreign Affairs
- Cyril Bright — former Minister of Planning and Economic Affairs
- John W. Sherman — Assistant Minister of Commerce and Trade
- James T. Phillips — former Minister of Finance, former Minister of Agriculture
- David Franklin Neal — former Minister of Planning and Economic Affairs
- Charles T. O. King — Deputy Minister for Agriculture
- Frank J. Stewart Sr. — Director of the Budget

The executions were described by journalist Larry C. Price as a "nightmarish scenario" in which the executed men were "murdered in front of screaming crowds of jubilant indigenous Liberian citizens." Cecil Dennis was the last man to be shot and was reported to have defiantly stared his killers down while uttering a prayer before his execution.

Only five members of the Tolbert administration survived the coup and its aftermath; among them was the Minister of Finance and future President Ellen Johnson Sirleaf, the Vice President Bennie Dee Warner, agricultural minister Florence Chenoweth and Burleigh Holder, Minister of National Security. Chenoweth was able to escape to neighboring Sierra Leone before making her way to the United States while Warner was out of the country at the time of the coup. Warner unsuccessfully tried setting up a government in exile before Doe offered him clemency and permission to return to Liberia in 1984. Sirleaf was initially detained but subsequently offered a position in Doe's government which she initially accepted, but later fled the country for the US after she publicly criticized Doe's policies. Both Sirleaf and Chenoweth later returned to Liberian politics after Doe's death.

Following the coup, Doe assumed the rank of general and established the People's Redemption Council (PRC), composed of himself and 14 other low-ranking officers, to rule the country. The PRC was dissolved after the 1985 general election, in which Doe was elected president; he was sworn in on 6 February 1986. Although Doe presented himself as a liberator and someone who would bring relief and more democracy to the country, his administration became accused of authoritarianism and of violently discriminating against other tribes. Doe continued to rule the country until he was murdered on 9 September 1990 by the INPFC, led by Prince Johnson, during the First Liberian Civil War.

On 1 July 2025, Tolbert and other victims of the coup were given a symbolic state funeral.

=== Allegation of foreign involvement ===
In August 2008, before a Truth and Reconciliation Commission (TRC) in Monrovia, Doe's former justice minister, Councillor Chea Cheapoo — who contested the 2011 Liberia Presidential elections — alleged the CIA had provided a map of the Executive Mansion, enabling the rebels to break into it; that it was a white American CIA agent, and not Harrison Pennoh, who shot and killed Tolbert; and that the Americans "were responsible for Liberia's nightmare". He also claimed he was not involved in the execution of Tolbert-era officials, despite his prominent position in Doe's regime. However, the next day, before the same TRC, another former minister of Samuel Doe, Boima Fahnbulleh, testified that "the Americans did not support the coup led by Mr. Doe", and that they had no knowledge of either Doe or his plans prior to the coup.
