= Bennie Dee Warner =

Liberian politician (1935–2024)

25th Vice President of Liberia
- In office 31 October 1977 – 12 April 1980
- President: William R. Tolbert Jr.
- Preceded by: James Edward Greene
- Succeeded by: Harry Fumba Moniba

Personal details
- Born: April 30, 1935 Careysburg District, Montserrado County, Liberia
- Died: October 27, 2024 (aged 89) Fort Worth, TX, United States
- Party: True Whig Party
- Occupation: Politician, clergyman

Bennie Dee Warner (30 April 1935 – 27 October 2024) was a Liberian politician and clergyman. He served as the country's 25th vice president from 1977 to 1980. Black Marks on White Paper, a documentary based on the life of Bennie D. Warner was produced in 2013. The documentary chronicles the life of Bishop Warner from his early years as a native Liberian, his education, his rise to leadership in the church and nation and his nomination and election to the vice-presidency of the Republic in 1977. The film tells the story of the military coup in 1980, which led to his decision to become a missionary to America for the last 35 years. Bob Hager was the producer/Director of the documentary under auspices of Tiny Seed Films.

== Life and career ==
Born on 30 April 1935 in Careysburg District, Montserrado County, Warner was later adopted by Vivienne Newton Gray and Ulysses Samuel Gray Sr.

He was a bishop in the United Methodist Church for four years before he was plucked from relative obscurity to become Vice President in 1977, succeeding James Edward Greene. Warner was attending a conference of Methodist bishops in Nashville, Indiana when a military coup led by Samuel Doe overthrew the Liberian government on 12 April 1980. Warner attempted to form a government in exile in Ivory Coast to challenge the coup makers. A month after he was evicted from political power, he was removed from ecclesiastical power: Methodist minister D. Sieh Doe proclaimed the bishopric vacant, and for six months the seat was empty and the church run by Warner's administrative assistant. On 6 December, the Liberia Annual Conference elected as his successor Bishop Arthur Flumo Kulah formerly the dean of the Gbarnga School of Theology. Warner had been the second native Liberian bishop in the history of the church in Liberia. Four years after Tolbert was overthrown, Commander-in-Chief Samuel Doe proclaimed clemency for him and announced that Warner was free to return to Liberia.

Bishop Warner later established residence in Oklahoma City, where he taught at the United Methodist Oklahoma City University and pastored Quayle United Methodist Church. He then served in Syracuse N.Y, before being appointed District Superintendent of the Camden District of the United Methodist Church in Arkansas.

Dee Warner died on 27 October 2024, at the age of 89.

Political offices
Preceded by James Edward Greene	Vice President of Liberia; 1977 – 1980	Succeeded by Henry Fumba Moniba
