= Frank E. Tolbert =

Liberian politician

Frank Emmanuel Tolbert (February 3, 1910 – April 22, 1980) was a Liberian politician and brother of President William R. Tolbert, Jr.

The oldest son of William R. Tolbert Sr., national chairman of the ruling True Whig Party, he grew up in Bensonville, attended Zion Praise Baptist Church, graduated from Liberia College, and became involved in politics relatively early in life.

As his family became more closely connected to the family of Supreme Court Justice William V.S. Tubman, Frank began to become prominent: when Tubman ran for president in 1943, he was rumoured to be Tubman's first choice for vice president, although his younger brother William was eventually chosen, perhaps because of Frank's unpredictable moods and violent temper.

Despite being passed over for vice president, Frank remained active in the TWP and national politics. By 1976, he was a member of the Senate and had been elected its president pro tempore. He was abruptly removed from office in 1980 by a military coup d'état: on 12 April, a group of enlisted men calling themselves the "People's Redemption Council murdered President Tolbert, arrested Frank Tolbert and many other high officials, and proclaimed themselves the country's new government. After a rapid trial in a kangaroo court, Tolbert and the others were summarily executed by firing squad on a Monrovia beach ten days after the coup.
