= Liberian exodus =

1878 mass emigration of black people from South Carolina to Liberia

The Liberian Exodus was the emigration of over 200 formerly enslaved African Americans from South Carolina to Liberia on board the Azor in 1878.

Interest in emigration had been growing among African American communities throughout the South since the 1876 United States presidential election and the overthrow of Radical Republican state governments by Redeemers. United States representative from South Carolina, Richard H. Cain, called for a million men to leave the injustices they suffered in the United States for Africa. In 1877, the Liberian Exodus Joint Stock Steamship Company was formed in Charleston, South Carolina with a fund of $6,000. Blacks began arriving in January 1878. The company then purchased a bark called the Azor, which arrived in Charleston in March.

On April 21, the Azor set sail with 206 emigrants. A young reporter for the News and Courier, A.B. Williams, accompanied the emigrants all the way to Monrovia and wrote a comprehensive account of the voyage.

The management committed several serious blunders which resulted in the deaths of 23 of the emigrants before they reached Africa. The water supply gave out shortly before arrival. Intended to last the emigrants six months after they started their new lives in Liberia, the food supply was of poor quality and was consumed entirely on the journey. Contrary to law, no physician was on board. One of the organizers, George Curtis, volunteered to serve as physician, but had no medical knowledge. He carried a copy of The Mariner's Medical Guide and improvised from the ship's medicine chest as well as he could.

The Azor stopped at Sierra Leone for supplies on May 19, and arrived at Monrovia on June 3, a journey totaling 42 days. In Liberia, many of the new emigrants found themselves impoverished and without supplies, and had to depend on charity. Enthusiasm for the Liberian exodus had been fed partly by exaggerated reports of the land's fertility, including claims that potatoes grew so large that a single one could feed a family for a day, and that certain trees produced bacon. Upon arrival, the passengers discovered that these claims were not true. Eighteen returned on the Monrovia in December 1879, reporting that not a single passenger of the Azor would stay in Liberia if he had the means to return to the U.S.

The Azor's stop at Sierra Leone incurred heavy, unforeseen expenses, creating a debt that the Liberian Exodus Company was unable to pay. The company announced a second voyage in early 1879, charging passengers fares rather than selling stock. However, due to the company's financial mismanagement, reports of the fatalities on the first voyage, and reports of the miserable conditions of the emigrants in Liberia, no second voyage ever took place.

Success did come for many of the emigrants however and by 1880, most had found a livelihood and did not wish to return to the United States. By 1890, the Azor's passengers were well represented among Liberia's most prominent citizens. Saul Hill, an earlier immigrant from York, South Carolina, established a successful, 700-acre coffee farm. Clement Irons, also of Charleston, built the first steamship constructed in Liberia. The Reverend David Frazier opened a coffee farm with 20,000 trees and was elected to the Liberian Senate in 1891. One passenger, Daniel Frank Tolbert, originally of a town called Ninety Six in Greenwood County, was the grandfather of President William Tolbert.
