= Masonic Order of Liberia =

Freemason Grand Lodge

The Grand Lodge of the Republic of Liberia is a fraternal organization based on the principles of Prince Hall Freemasonry. Prior to 1980, its membership tended to consist of Americo-Liberians and it was influential within the ruling True Whig party from its founding until the coup of Samuel Doe in 1980, when much of its senior leadership was killed and the new military regime banned masonic activities in the country.

== History ==
=== Expansion and political dominance ===
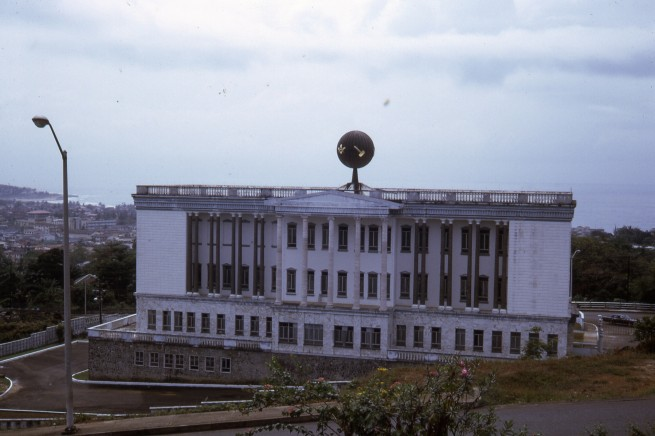
Grand Masonic Temple in Monrovia prior to the civil war

The Grand Lodge of Liberia was founded in 1867. By the 1970s there were 17 subordinate lodges and the majority of Liberia's high-ranking officials were Masons. Matters of state were widely believed to have been decided from within the lodges. Being a Mason was a veritable prerequisite for positions of political leadership in the True Whig Party. Liberia's Masons were criticized for their influence as well as for the exclusion of indigenous Liberians from their ranks.

=== Prohibition and reinstatement ===
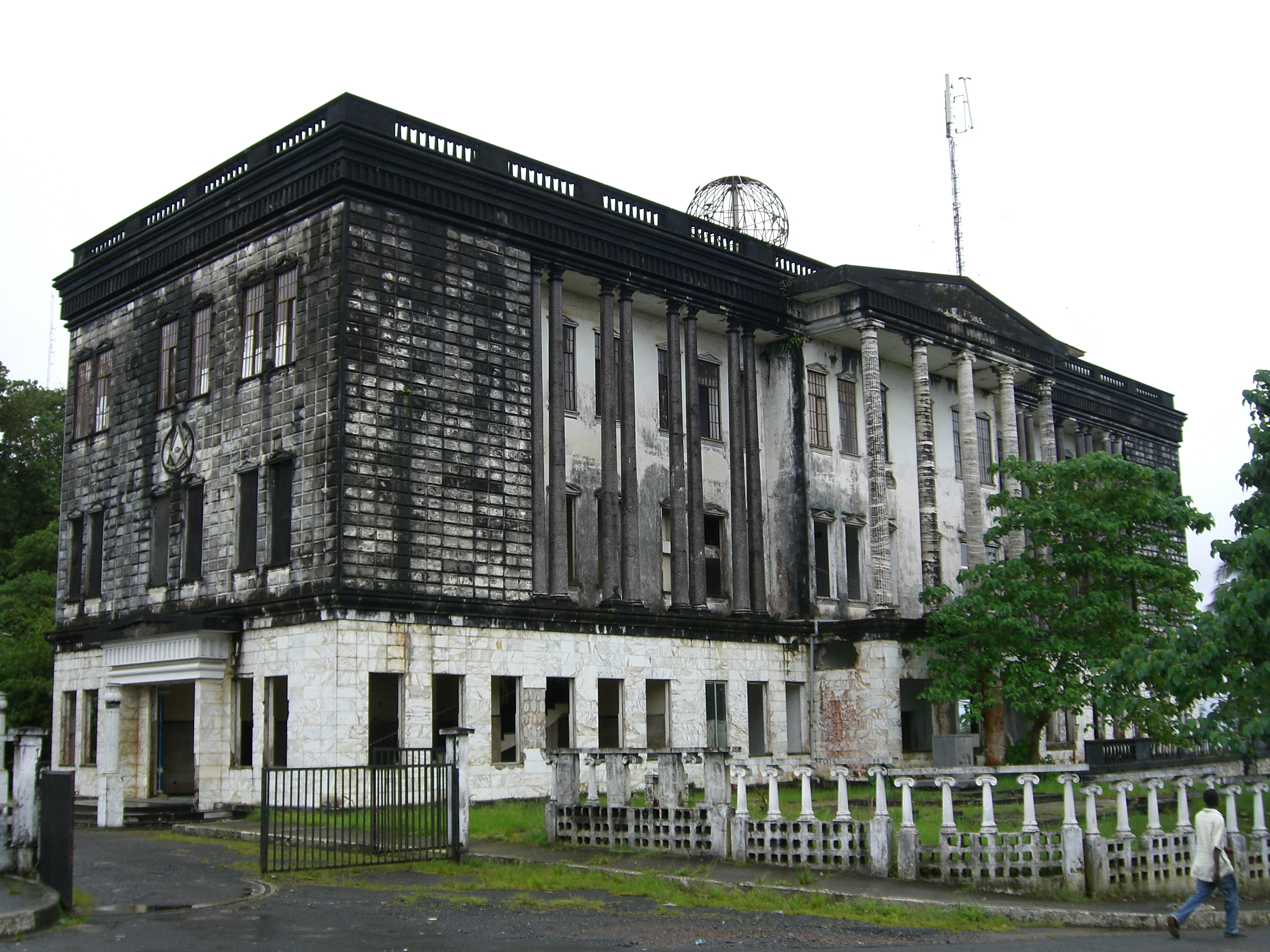
Grand Masonic Temple in 2006 after undergoing massive destruction

After Master Sgt. Samuel Doe assumed leadership in a coup d'etat in 1980, Liberia's masons faced violent retribution. The President of Liberia and the order's Grand Master, William R. Tolbert, Jr., was overthrown and killed in the coup. Freemasonry was banned by Doe in 1980, which caused the Grand Lodge's influence in Liberia to greatly diminish. President Doe, who later desired to become a Mason, lifted the ban on Masonic activities which led to the convening of a special Prince Hall meeting held in New Orleans in 1987 to elect a new Grand Master. This was followed by a meeting in Monrovia in 1988 when Freemasonry was formally reinstituted. President Doe was subsequently initiated in 1989.

In 1990, Samuel Doe in turn was murdered by Prince Johnson, one time ally of Charles Taylor, in an internationally televised display. To prove that Doe was not protected by black magic, his ears were cut off, then some of his fingers and toes, and finally he was murdered by decapitation and buried (his body was later exhumed and reburied). The spectacle of his torture was videotaped and seen on news reports around the world. The video shows Johnson sipping a beer and being fanned by an assistant as Doe's ear is cut off.

=== During and after the civil war ===
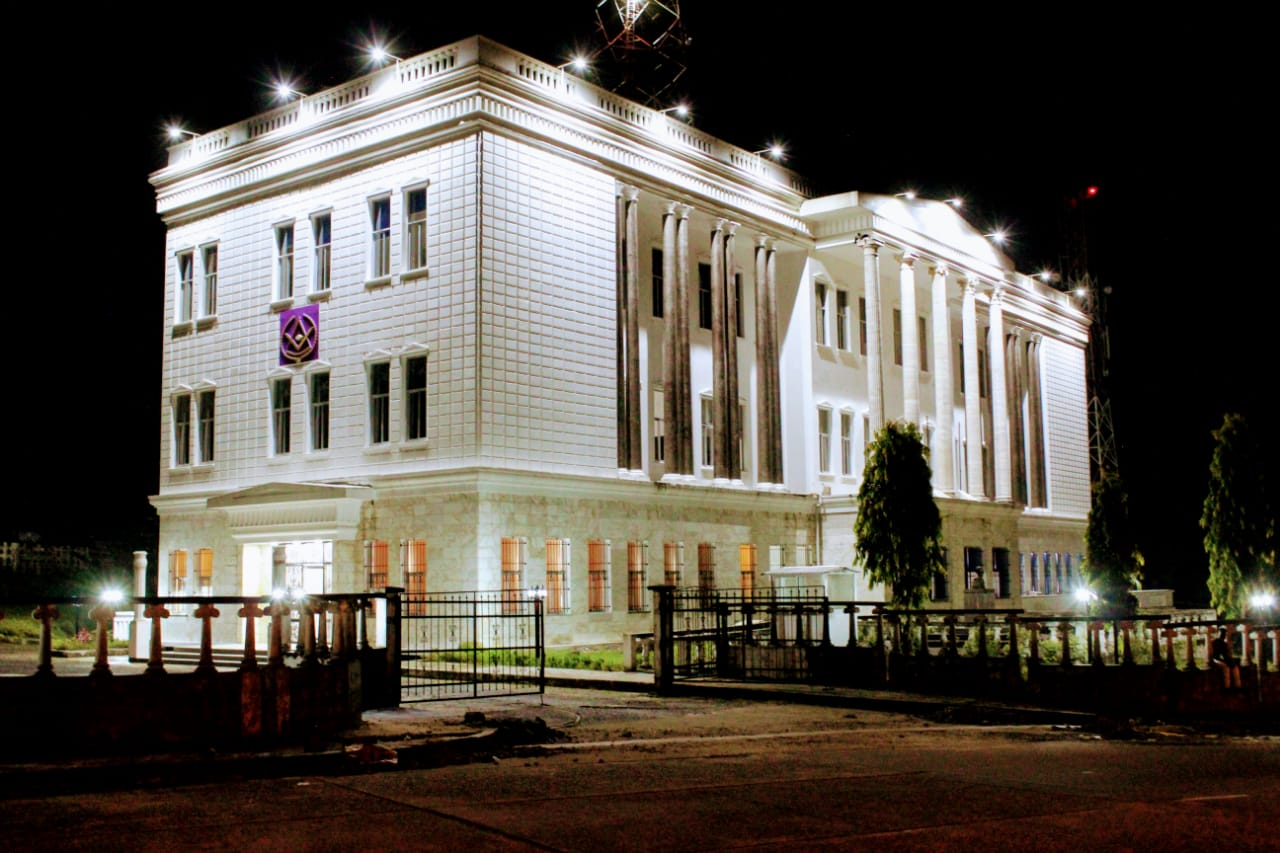
The renovation of the Grand Masonic Temple was completed in 2018 under the reign of Grand Master James E. Pierre

During the First Liberian Civil War, the Grand Masonic Temple located in the Mamba Point section of Monrovia was the scene of many battles, and its ruins became home to thousands of squatters. On trial, President Charles Taylor made light of allowing his troops to post human heads and skulls of enemies at checkpoints, saying it was no worse than the display of skulls in “Western fraternal organizations.”

The Masons evicted squatters from the Grand Lodge by 2005, and the Masonic Temple has resumed to hold meetings for the subordinate Lodges in the Blue Lodge Room, quarterly Grand Communications in the Grand Lodge room as well as meetings for the Order of Eastern Star and its subordinate Chapters in their respective rooms within the Temple. According to the Grand Lodge's 2015 reports, there are 19 Subordinate Lodges in Liberia with a total membership of 1,750. Benoni Urey, a Freemason who is considered Liberia’s richest man and a possible candidate for the Liberian presidency, has said he wants to see the Masonic Order of Liberia return to prominence in Liberian politics.
