= Careysburg District =

District of Liberia

Coordinates: 06°24′12″N 10°32′55″W

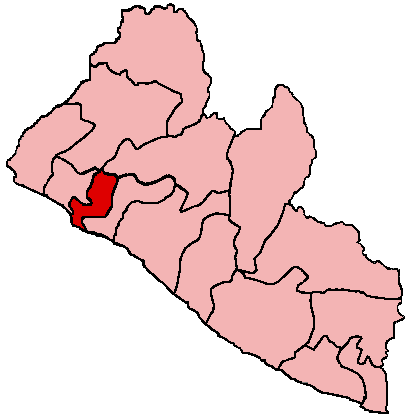

Careysburg District is one of four districts located in Montserrado County, Liberia. Bensonville is the capital, and the total district population is 28,463.

== History ==
The city of Careysburg was first settled in 1856 by freed slaves from the United States and Barbados. The location away from the Liberian coast was chosen for health reasons, because of the high death rate due to mosquito-spread diseases among early settlers on the coast. Careysburg was named for former American Rev. Lott Carey.

Among Careysburg's natives was Bennie Dee Warner, who served as Vice President from 1977 to 1980.

== Infrastructure ==
Careysburg has a station on the western railway system of Liberia. The Mount Coffee Hydropower Project and the White Plains Water Treatment Plant are both in the district

== See also ==
- Transport in Liberia
