= Bensonville =

Capital of Montserrado County, Liberia

Bensonville Bentol, Bentol City
- Location in Liberia
- Coordinates: 6°26′44″N 10°36′35″W
- Country: Liberia
- County: Montserrado
- District: Careysburg
- Elevation: 300 ft (90 m)

Population (2008)
  - Total: 4,089
- Climate: Am

Bensonville is the capital city of Montserrado County, Liberia. As of the 2008 national census, its population stood at 4,089. Bensonville is located 20 miles (32 km) away from the national capital, Monrovia, which is also located in Montserrado County. It is a commercial center for the surrounding agricultural area.

It was the birthplace of William R. Tolbert, Jr., the 20th president of Liberia. Before he was killed in a coup in 1980, Tolbert had planned to make Bensonville the country's new capital city.

Prior to the Liberian Civil War, Bensonville's industrial activity included producing milled rice, sawn wood, soap, plastics, paints, furniture and fixtures, cement blocks, oils, processed fish, and confections.
