= William Tolbert =

President of Liberia from 1971 to 1980

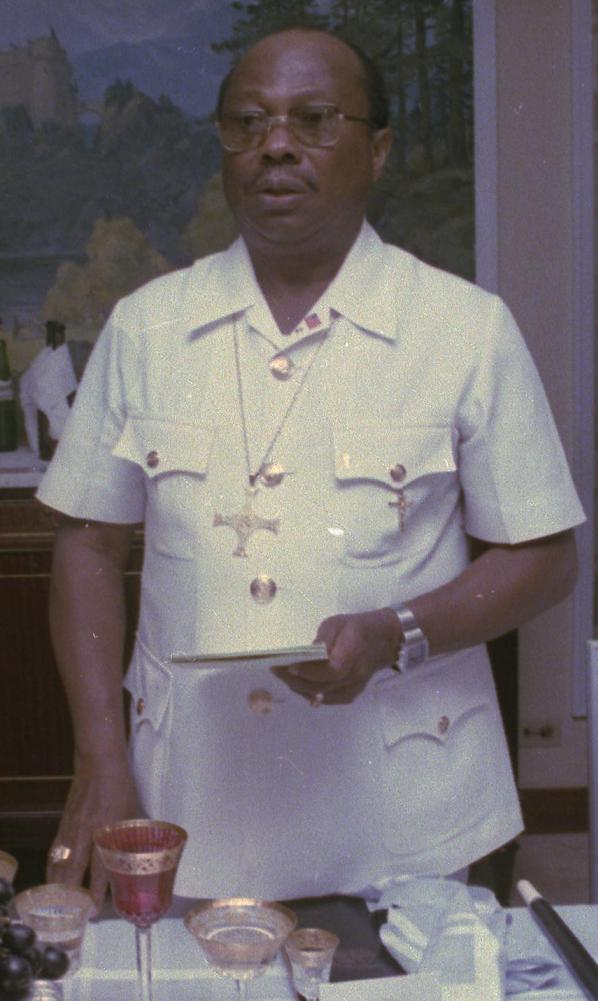
- Tolbert in 1978

20th President of Liberia
- In office 23 July 1971 – 12 April 1980
- Vice President: Vacant (1971–1972); James Edward Greene (1972–1977); Bennie Dee Warner (1977–1980)
- Preceded by: William Tubman
- Succeeded by: Samuel Doe^{[a]}

23rd Vice President of Liberia
- In office 1 January 1952 – 23 July 1971
- President: William Tubman
- Preceded by: Clarence Lorenzo Simpson
- Succeeded by: James Edward Greene

Personal details
- Born: William Richard Tolbert Jr. 13 May 1913 Bensonville, Liberia
- Died: 12 April 1980 (aged 66) Monrovia, Liberia
- Cause of death: Assassination by firearm
- Resting place: Palm Grove Cemetery
- Party: True Whig
- Spouse: Victoria David (m. 1936)
- Children: 8
- Initially as chairman of the People's Redemption Council before assuming the presidency in 1986

William Richard Tolbert Jr. (13 May 1913 – 12 April 1980) was a Liberian politician who served as the 20th president of Liberia from 1971 until his assassination in 1980.

Tolbert was an Americo-Liberian and trained as a civil servant before entering the House of Representatives in 1943 for the True Whig Party, then the only established party in Liberia. Tolbert was elected the 23rd vice president of Liberia to William Tubman in 1952 and served in that position until he became president following Tubman's death in 1971. Tolbert's early presidency saw liberal reforms and the adoption of a Non-Alignment stance, but growing economic troubles and tensions between Americo-Liberians and indigenous Liberians led to instability.

Tolbert was assassinated in the 1980 coup d'état by the People's Redemption Council led by Samuel Doe, marking the end of 133 years of Americo-Liberian rule in Liberia.

== Background ==
William Richard Tolbert Jr. was born in Bensonville, Liberia, to William Richard Tolbert Sr. (1869–1948) and Charlotte Augusta Tolbert, née Hoff of Cape Mount, Liberia. The Tolbert and Hoff families were Americo-Liberian families of African American descent and the Hoff family originated from Virginia. William Tolbert Sr. was the son of Daniel Frank Tolbert, who was formerly enslaved in South Carolina and emigrated to Liberia in the Liberian exodus of 1878. The Tolbert clan was one of the largest Americo-Liberian families in Liberia.

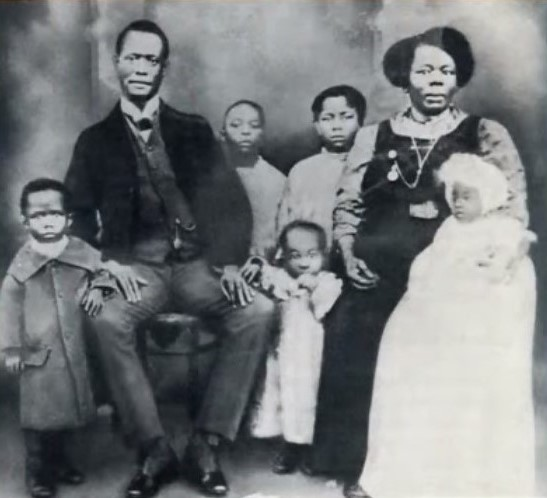
Tolbert family in 1913

He attended Bensonville Elementary School, Crummell Hall Episcopalian High School. He studied at the University of Liberia and obtained a Bachelor of Arts in 1934. He married Victoria A. David, of Americo-Liberian and Vai descent, with whom he had eight children.

Tolbert was first elected to the House of Representatives in 1943, and served until being elected vice president in 1951. A Baptist minister, in 1965 he became the first African to serve as president of the Baptist World Alliance, and was also a member of Phi Beta Sigma fraternity. He became Grand Master of the Masonic Order of Liberia.

== Vice presidency (1952–1971) ==
In 1951 Liberia held elections to decide president and vice president. William Tubman who was president in 1951 chose Tolbert as his vice president. They would go on to win and serve 6 terms until Tubman died in 1971.

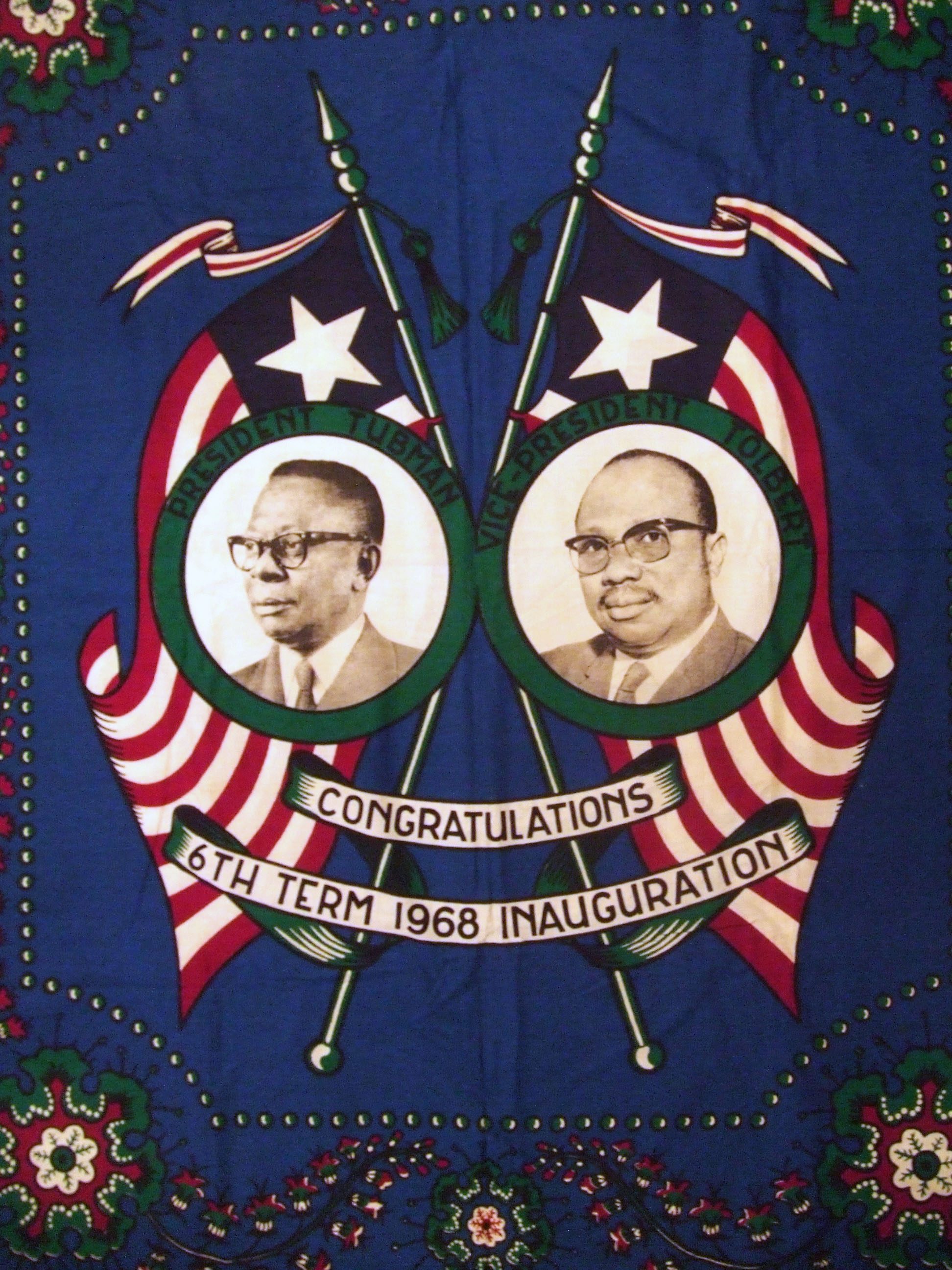
Tubman & Tolbert pagne for 1968 inauguration.

In February 1968 William R. Tolbert arrived in Jamaica as a part of his Caribbean tour to meet as many Baptists as possible. He met with the prime minister to address a service at the East Queen Street Baptist Church, and other official functions.

On 23 July 1971 President William Tubman died in London during a visit which led Tolbert to become president.

== Presidency and assassination ==
Tolbert succeeded to the presidency upon the death of incumbent William Tubman in 1971. To the outside world, the peaceful transfer of power was seen as a sign of continuing political stability in Liberia, a stark contrast with the political turmoil gripping much of the rest of Africa at the time. However, Liberia was effectively a one-party state, with the national legislature and judiciary subservient to the executive branch and only limited observation of civil liberties.

=== Attitude towards opposition and indigenous ethnic groups ===
Upon becoming president, Tolbert initiated some liberal reforms. Though he was re-elected in 1975, his government was criticized sharply for failing to address the deep economic disparities between different sectors of the population, notably the Americo-Liberians, who had dominated the country since independence, and the various indigenous ethnic groups which constituted the majority of the population.

Because Tolbert was a member of one of the most influential and affluent Americo-Liberian families, everything from cabinet appointments to economic policy was tainted with allegations of nepotism. Thanks to his father who spoke Kpelle, Tolbert was the second Liberian president, after President Stephen Allen Benson, to speak an indigenous language, and he promoted a program to bring more indigenous people into the government.

This initiative caused a good deal of chagrin among Americo-Liberians who accused Tolbert of "letting the peasants into the kitchen." Indeed, it lacked support within Tolbert's own administration. While the indigenous majority felt the change was occurring too slowly, many Americo-Liberians felt it was too rapid.

Despite following Tubman's 27-year presidency, Tolbert refused to follow his predecessor's hold on office until death. He successfully worked for a constitutional amendment to bar the president from serving more than eight years in office, and in 1976 he vowed fierce opposition to members of the Legislature who sought to repeal the amendment and again permit what Tolbert called an "evil tradition". Three years later, when True Whig partisans petitioned him to seek the amendment's repeal, he replied that their statement would only encourage him in his previous position: "I will serve my country as long as I have life. I do not have to [be?] President to do so."

=== Foreign policy ===
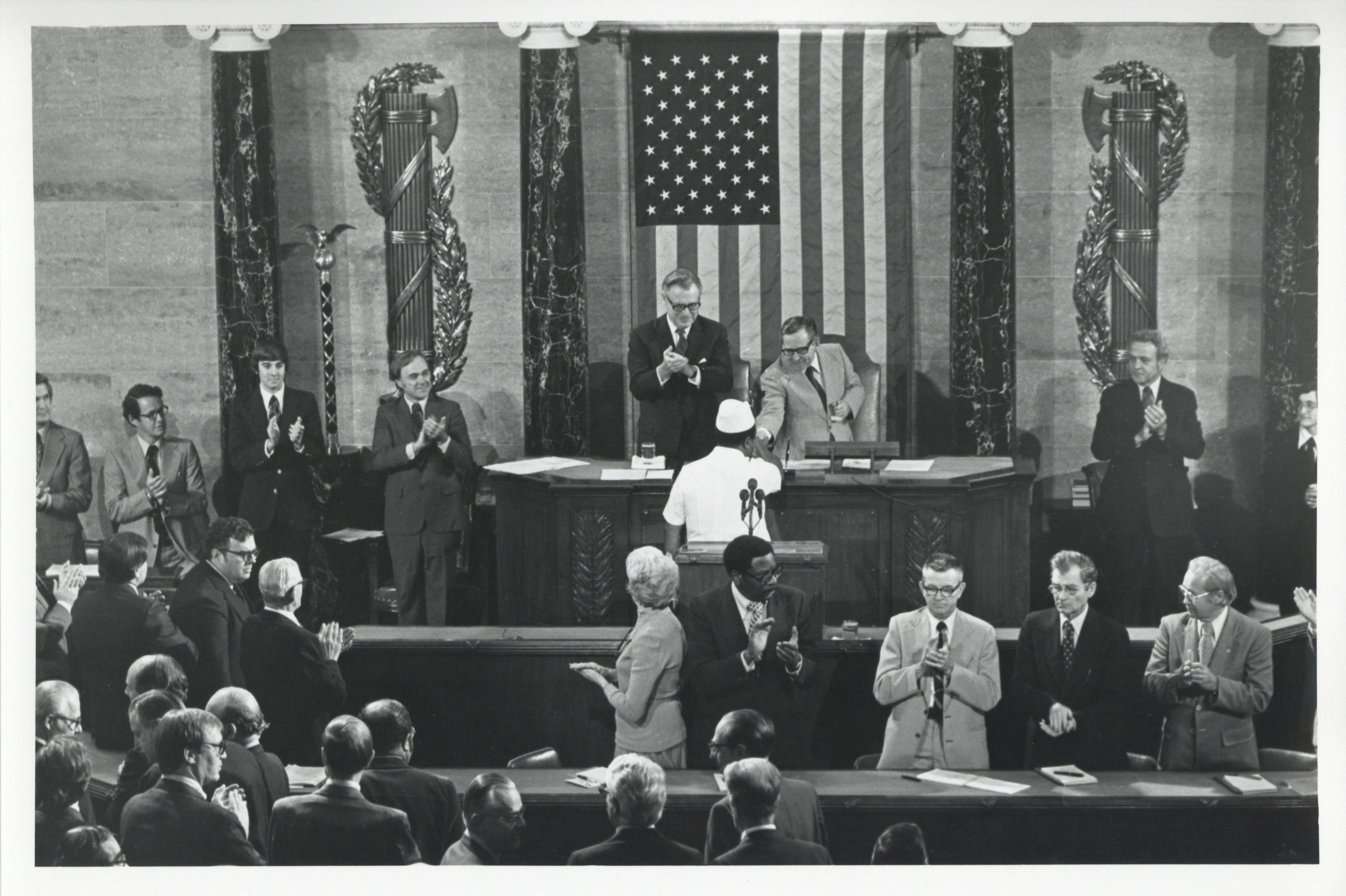
Tolbert in Congress September 1976.

Abandoning Tubman's strong pro-West foreign policy, Tolbert adopted one which focused on promoting Liberia's political independence. To this end, he established diplomatic relations with the Soviet Union, China, Cuba, and several other Eastern Bloc countries, thus adopting a more nonaligned posture.

Sometime in 1974, Tolbert accepted aid from the Soviet Union for the first time. While he was president (1971–1980) Liberia's relations with the United States strained because of the establishment of diplomatic relations with the Soviets and Eastern Bloc. Tolbert's official state visit to the USA took place in 1976.

Tolbert severed Liberia's ties with Israel during the Yom Kippur War in October 1973 and spoke in favor of recognizing national rights of the Palestinian people. However, Tolbert supported the United States on the Vietnam War, as had his predecessor, William Tubman. Tolbert was chairman of the Organisation of African Unity from July 1979 until he was killed in April 1980.

=== Economy ===
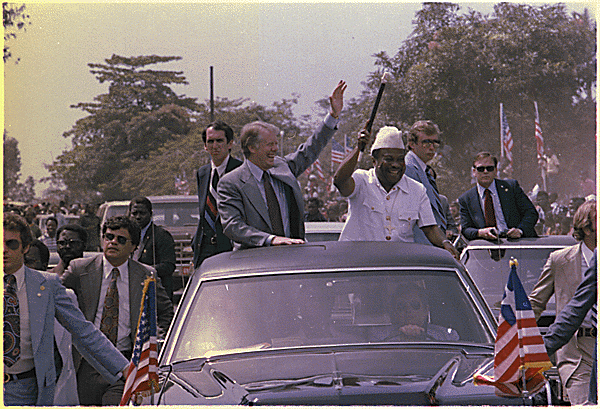
Tolbert during U.S. President Jimmy Carter's visit to Monrovia in April 1978.

Throughout the 1970s, the world price of rubber was low, putting pressure on the Liberian economy. Tolbert brought a new approach to the Liberian government's relations with foreign companies. Companies like Firestone, which had operated for years without being audited by the government, were audited and forced to pay millions of dollars in back taxes. Old concession agreements were renegotiated, and new concession agreements were negotiated with an emphasis on accountability of the private sector to the Liberian government.

In May 1975, Liberia became a signatory to the treaty that established the Economic Community of West African States (ECOWAS) in order to create a common market in West Africa and promote regional economic integration and stability in 15 West African countries, with the intention that it would mirror the success of the European Common Market.

By the late 1970s, Tolbert became increasingly open to overtures of economic assistance from Libya and Cuba.

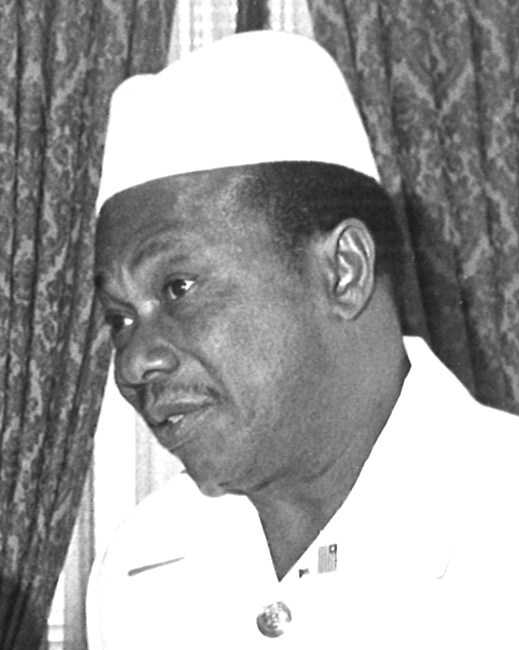
President William R. Tolbert Jr. on 23 September 1976

He advocated for "Humanistic Capitalism" as an economic development model for his country. Tolbert described his form of "Humanistic Capitalism" as a combination of free enterprise, the traditional altruistic way of life in Africa, and Christian morals and values, the latter two components defining "Humanism". He declared in his annual address to parliament in January 1977: "Humanistic Capitalism has as its primary concern and central interest the individual person whose value, worth and dignity must be considered supreme, and should never be exploited in any manner, but rather ever respected and protected." He admonished the Americo-Liberian elite, urging them to invest part of their wealth and profits in projects to help raise the standard of living for the impoverished masses of Liberia. By creating a larger entrepreneurial middle class, the country would become less dependent on foreign investors, and Liberia would achieve some sort of self-reliance.

=== Return of a two-party system ===
Liberia had been a one-party state since 1877. However, in 1973, the country returned to a two-party system when the Progressive Alliance of Liberia, headed by Gabriel Baccus Matthews, became recognized as a legitimate opposition party.

=== Maryland County ritual killings ===
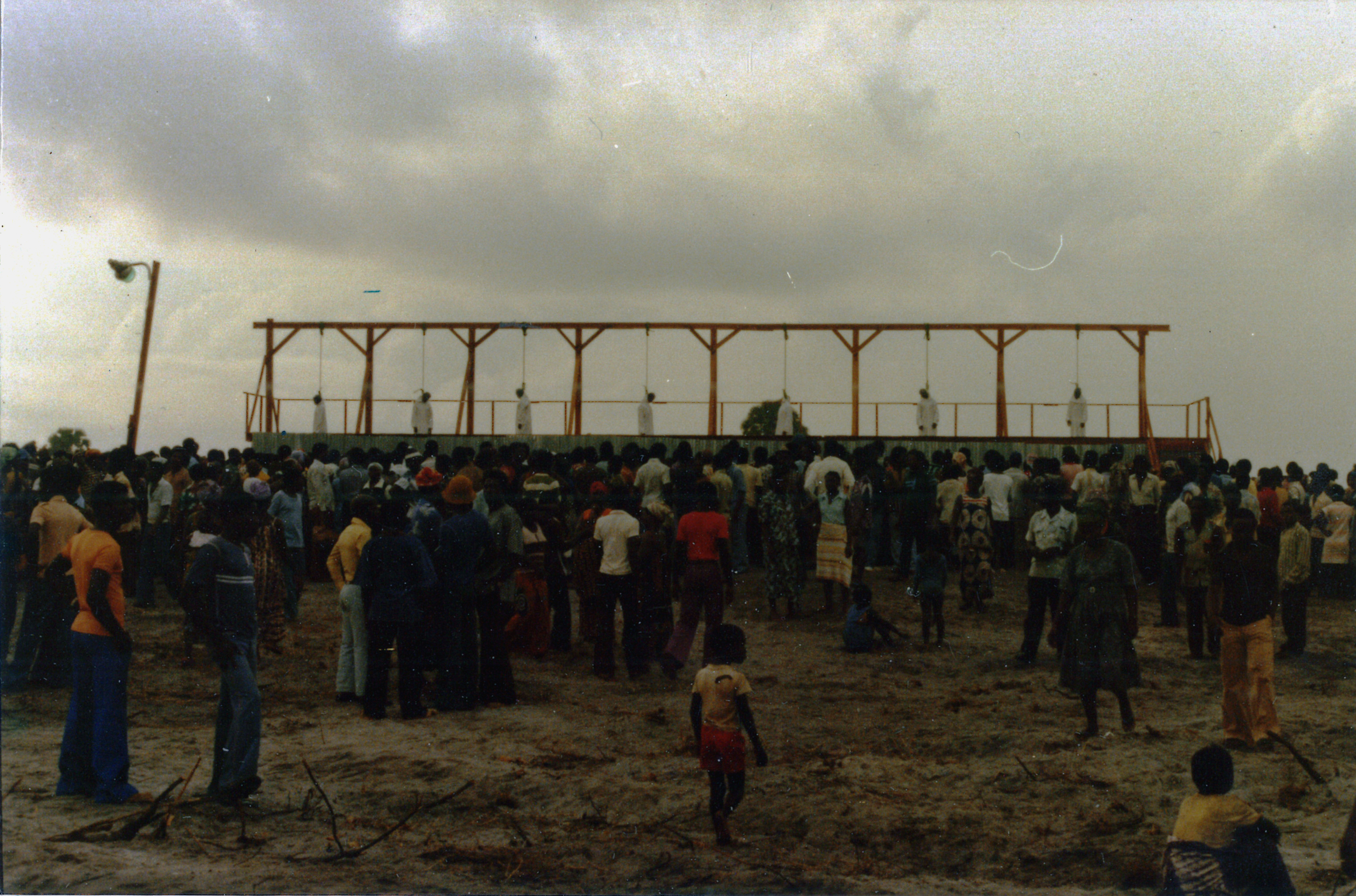
The public hanging of seven persons convicted of the Maryland ritual killings.

Between 1965 and 1977 over 100 murders occurred around Harper in Maryland County, many of which involved mutilation and the removal of body parts. During the 1970s Liberians in Maryland County were constantly under the threat of ritual murders. Between November 1976 and July 1977, 14 people had disappeared in the county, prompting Tolbert to fire the Superintendent of Maryland County, James Daniel Anderson, for failure to report the missing people and publicly declare "Anyone who kills deliberately: The law will kill that person". Twelve suspects were eventually arrested; seven, including four government officials, were convicted and executed.

=== Rice riots ===
In early April 1979, Tolbert's minister of agriculture, Florence Chenoweth, proposed an increase in the subsidized price of rice from $22 per 100-pound bag to $26. Chenoweth asserted that the increase would serve as an added inducement for rice farmers to continue farming instead of abandoning their farms for jobs in the cities or on the rubber plantations. Political opponents criticized the proposal as self-serving, pointing out that Chenoweth and the Tolbert family operated large rice farms and would therefore realize a tidy profit from the proposed price increase.

The Progressive Alliance of Liberia called for a peaceful demonstration in Monrovia to protest the proposed price increase. On 14 April about 2,000 activists began what was planned as a peaceful march on the Executive Mansion. The protest march swelled dramatically when the protesters were joined en route by more than 10,000 "back street boys" causing the march to quickly degenerate into a disorderly mob of riot and destruction. Widespread looting ensued with damage to private property estimated at over $40 million. At least 41 demonstrators were killed by shooting. This incident set fire to the powder. During the following year, riots and demonstrations shook the country. Tolbert tried in vain to restore order by arresting the opposition leaders, but his attempts were unsuccessful and the disorder increased. Tolbert's credibility was severely damaged by the Rice Riots.

=== Coup d'état and death ===
In March 1980 Tolbert ordered the banning of the PAL, and had Gabriel Bacchus Matthews and the rest of the organization's leadership arrested on charges of treason.

In the early hours of 12 April 1980, 17 non-commissioned officers and soldiers of the Armed Forces of Liberia led by Master Sergeant Samuel Doe launched a violent coup d'état; all of them were "indigenous" Liberians who later became the founding members of the People's Redemption Council, the governing body of the new regime. The group entered the Presidential palace and killed Tolbert, whose body was dumped into a mass grave together with 27 other victims of the coup. A crowd of angry Liberians gathered to shout insults and throw rocks at the bodies. Tolbert's body was later moved to a spot in Monrovia's Palm Grove Cemetery, not far from the bodies of those killed in the Rice Riots. On 1 July 2025, Tolbert and other victims of the coup were given a symbolic state funeral.

By the end of the month, most of the cabinet members of the Tolbert administration had been put on trial in a kangaroo court and sentenced to death. Many of them were publicly executed on 22 April at a beach near the Barclay Training Center in Monrovia. Only four of Tolbert's cabinet heads survived the coup and its aftermath; among them was the minister of finance, future president Ellen Johnson Sirleaf.

=== Accounts of Tolbert's death ===
Undisputedly, Tolbert was dead by the end of 12 April 1980, the day of the coup d'état. There are competing stories as to the time and manner of his death.

Steven Ellis, in his book Mask of Anarchy, says the president was found sleeping in his office, where the soldiers killed him, while Ellen Johnson Sirleaf's biography, This Child Will Be Great, says Tolbert was seized and killed in his bed.

== Family ==
Some of Tolbert's children live in the US. His brother Stephen A. Tolbert served as his finance minister in the government until his death in a plane crash on 29 April 1975. One of his sons, A. Benedict Tolbert, was killed in the aftermath of the coup. He had taken refuge in the French Embassy but was arrested by members of Doe's security force who violated diplomatic immunity. He was reportedly thrown out of a military aircraft while being transported to a prison in Lofa County.

Three of his daughters are no longer alive. Victoria Tolbert Yancy died in 1971; Evelyn Tolbert Richardson died in Westchester County, New York, United States, in 1993; and Christine Augusta Tolbert-Norman died from cancer in Cary, North Carolina, United States, in 2021. His widow, former First Lady Victoria Tolbert, died in Minnesota on 8 November 1997 at the age of 81. She had moved to the United States after being released from house arrest in the aftermath of the coup. His grandson Tolbert Williams currently lives and works in the UK.

== See also ==
- History of Liberia
- Harrison Pennoh

Political offices
Preceded by Clarence Lorenzo Simpson	Vice President of Liberia; 1952–1971	Succeeded by James Edward Greene
Preceded by William Tubman	President of Liberia; 1971–1980	Succeeded by Samuel Doe
