= Comparative navy enlisted ranks of Anglophone countries =

Rank comparison chart of Non-commissioned officer and enlisted ranks for navies of Anglophone states.

== Officers ==
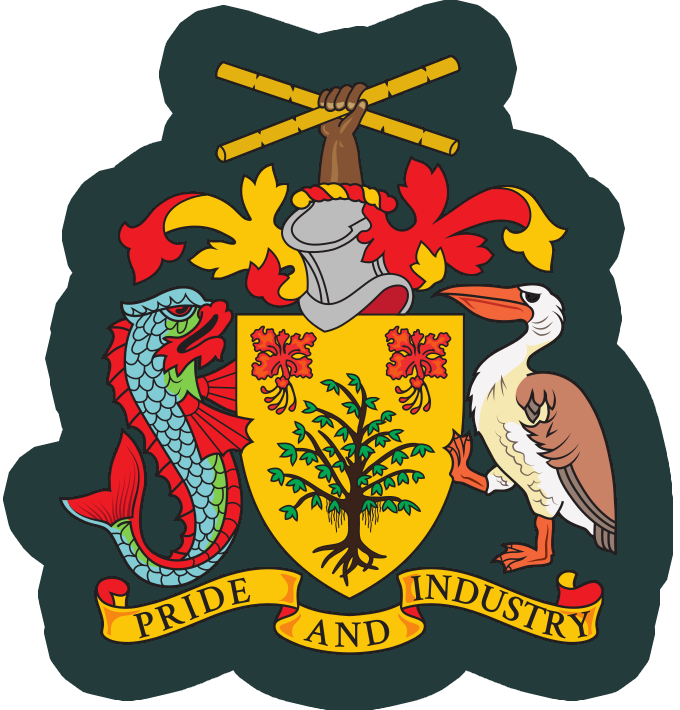
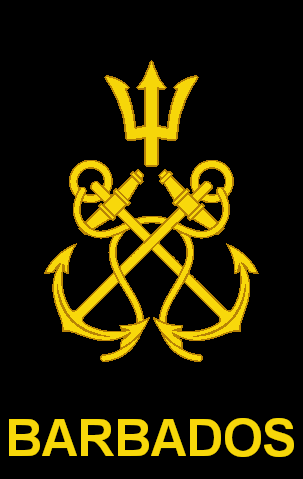
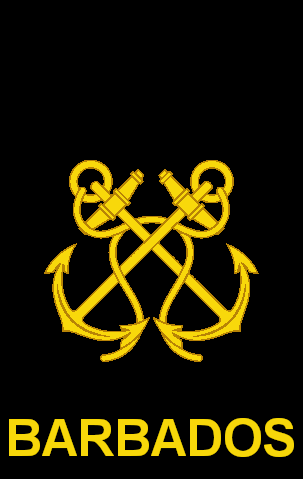
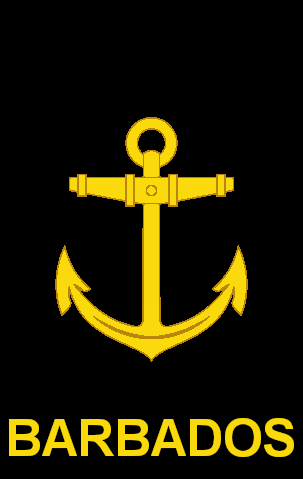
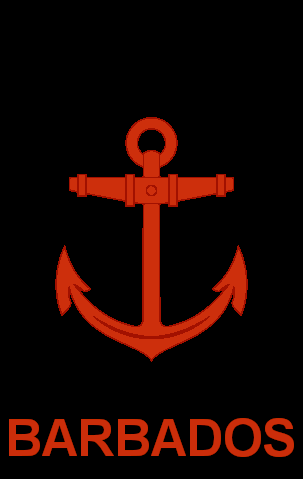
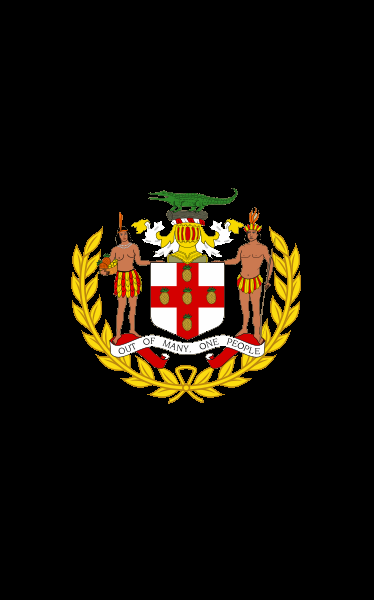
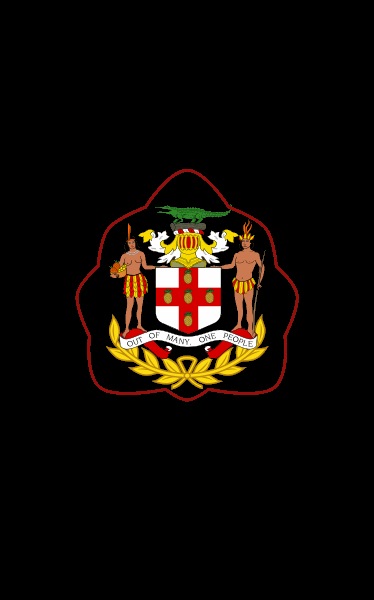
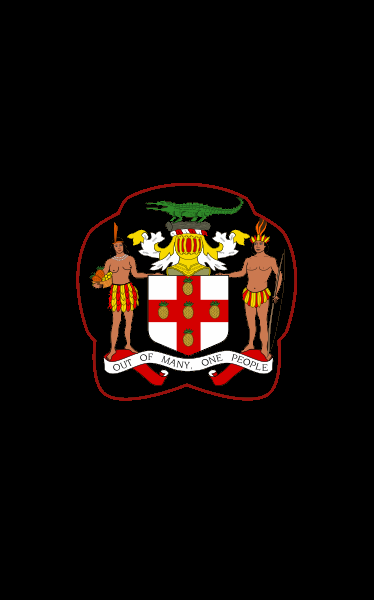
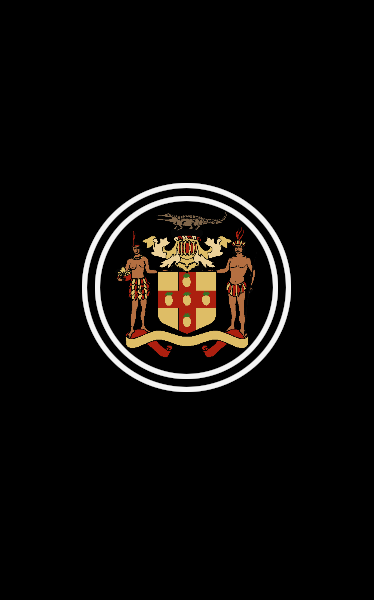
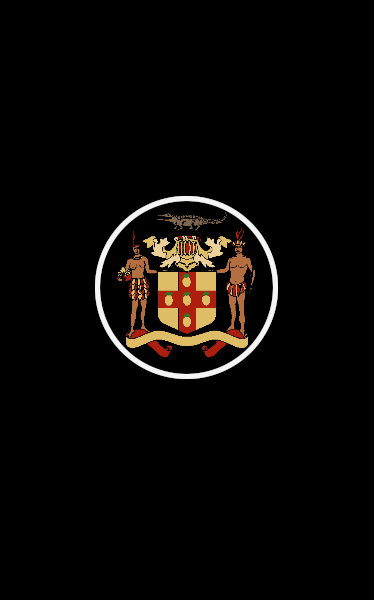
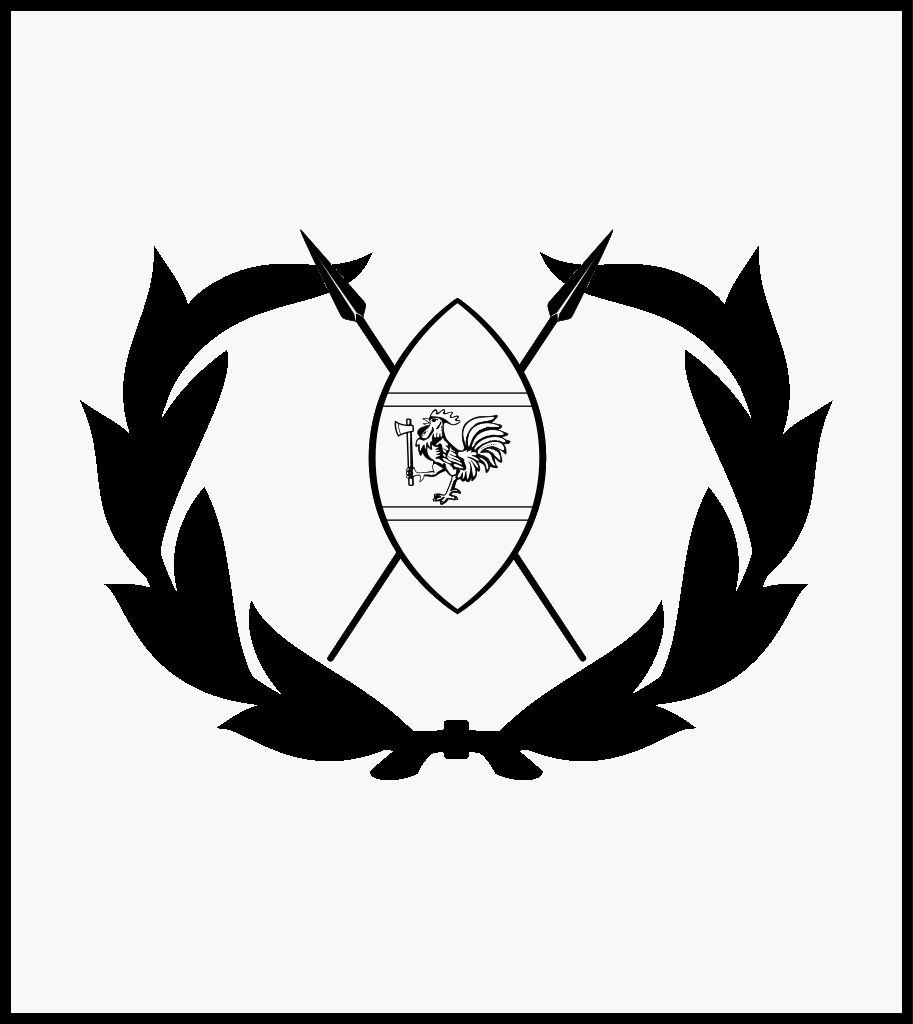
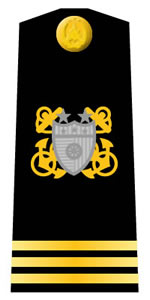
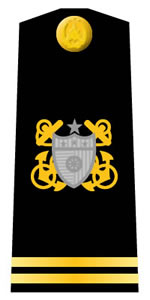
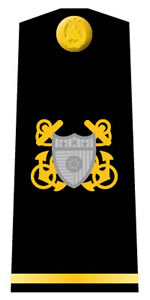
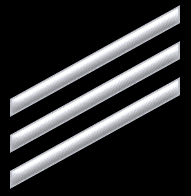
Rank group	Senior NCOs							Junior NCOs			Enlisted
Antigua and Barbuda Coast Guard
Antigua and Barbuda Coast Guard	Master chief petty officer class 1		Master chief petty officer class 2		Chief petty officer	Petty officer		Leading seaman			Able seaman
Royal Australian Navy
Royal Australian Navy	Warrant Officer of the Navy	Warrant officer	Chief petty officer			Petty officer		Leading seaman			Able seaman	Seaman
Royal Bahamas Defence Force												No insignia
Royal Bahamas Defence Force	Force chief petty officer				Chief petty officer	Petty officer		Leading marine			Able marine	Marine
Barbados Coast Guard												No insignia
Barbados Coast Guard	Master chief petty officer class 1		Master chief petty officer class 2		Chief petty officer	Petty officer		Leading seaman			Able seaman	Seaman
Belize Coast Guard
Belize Coast Guard	Master chief petty officer		Senior chief petty officer		Chief petty officer	Petty officer first class	Petty officer second class	Petty officer third class		Seaman	Seaman apprentice
Botswana	No navy
Burundi	No navy
Cameroon Navy
Cameroon Navy	Maître principal		Premier maître			Maître	Second-maître	Quartier-maître de 1^{ère} classe		Quartier-maître de 2^{ème} classe	Matelot de 1^{re} classe	Matelot
Royal Canadian Navy
Royal Canadian Navy	Chief petty officer 1st class		Chief petty officer 2nd class		Petty officer 1st class	Petty officer 2nd class		Master sailor		Sailor 1st class	Sailor 2nd class	Sailor 3rd class
Royal Canadian Navy	Premier(ère) maître de 1^{re} classe		Premier(ère) maître de 2^{e} classe		Maître de 1^{re} classe	Maître de 2^{e} classe		Matelot-chef		Matelot de 1^{re} classe	Matelot de 2^{e} classe	Matelot de 3^{e} classe
Dominica	No navy
Eswatini	No navy
Republic of Fiji Navy												No insignia
Republic of Fiji Navy	Warrant officer class 1		Warrant officer class 2		Chief petty officer	Petty officer		Leading seaman				Ordinary seaman
Gambian Navy
Ghana Navy											No insignia	No insignia
Ghana Navy					Chief petty officer	Petty officer first class	Petty officer second class	Leading seaman			Able seaman	Ordinary seaman
Grenada	No navy
Guyana Coast Guard
Guyana Coast Guard	Fleet chief petty officer		Chief petty officer		Senior petty officer	Petty officer		Leading seaman			Able seaman
Haitian Navy
Indian Navy											No insignia
Indian Navy	Master chief petty officer I मास्टर चीफ पेटी ऑफिसर फर्स्ट क्लास		Master chief petty officer II मास्टर चीफ पेटी ऑफिसर सेकेंड क्लास		Chief petty officer चीफ पेटी ऑफिसर	Petty officer पेटी ऑफिसर		Leading Seaman लीडिंग सीमैन			Seaman Ist class सीमैन फर्स्ट क्लास	Seaman IInd class सीमैन सेकंड क्लास
Irish Naval Service												No insignia
Irish Naval Service	Warrant officer Oifigeach barántais		Senior chief petty officer Ard-mhion-oifigeach sinsearach		Chief petty officer Ard-mhion-oifigeach	Senior petty officer Mion-oifigeach sinsearach	Petty officer Mion-oifigeach	Leading seaman Mairnéalach ceannais		Able seaman Mairnéalach inniúil	Ordinary seaman Mairnéalach	Seaman recruit Earcach
Jamaican Coast Guard												No insignia
Jamaican Coast Guard	Master chief petty officer 1		Master chief petty officer		Chief petty officer	Petty officer		Leading seaman			Able seaman	Ordinary seaman
Kenya Navy											No insignia
Kenya Navy	Warrant officer class 1		Warrant officer class 2		Senior sergeant	Sergeant		Corporal			Private (or equivalent)
Kiribati	No navy
Lesotho	No navy
Liberian National Coast Guard
Liberian National Coast Guard	Master chief petty officer		Senior chief petty officer		Chief petty officer	Petty officer first class	Petty officer second class	Petty officer third class		Seaman	Seaman recruit
Malawi Army											No insignia
Malawi Army	Warrant Officer Class 1		Warrant Officer Class 2		Staff Sergeant	Sergeant		Corporal		Lance Corporal	Private (or equivalent)
Mali	No navy
Maritime Squadron of Malta											No insignia
Maritime Squadron of Malta	Warrant Officer Class 1		Warrant Officer Class 2		Staff Sergeant	Sergeant		Bombardier		Lance Bombardier	Gunner (or equivalent)
Marshall Islands	No navy
Mauritius	No navy
Federated States of Micronesia	No navy
Namibian Navy											No insignia
Namibian Navy	Warrant officer class 1		Warrant officer class 2		Chief petty officer	Petty officer		Leading seaman		Able seaman	Seaman
Nauru	No navy
Royal New Zealand Navy
Royal New Zealand Navy	Warrant officer				Chief petty officer	Petty officer		Leading hand			Able rate	Ordinary rate
Nigerian Navy												No insignia
Nigerian Navy	Navy Warrant Officer	Master Warrant Officer	Warrant Officer			Petty officer		Leading seaman		Able seaman	Seaman	Ordinary seaman
Pakistan Navy												No insignia
Pakistan Navy	Master chief petty officer ماسٹر چیف پیٹی آفیسر		Fleet chief petty officer فلیٹ چیف پیٹی آفیسر		Chief petty officer چیف پیٹی آفیسر	Petty officer چھوٹا افسر		Leading seaman معروف سی مین			Able seaman قابل ملاح	Ordinary seaman عام سی مین
Palau	No navy
Papua New Guinea Maritime Element												No insignia
Papua New Guinea Maritime Element	Warrant officer				Chief petty officer	Petty officer		Leading seaman			Able seaman	Seaman
Philippine Navy
Philippine Navy	Master chief petty officer	Senior chief petty officer	Chief petty officer		Petty officer, first class	Petty officer, second class	Petty officer, third class	Seaman first class			Seaman second class	Apprentice seaman
Rwanda	No navy
Saint Kitts and Nevis Coast Guard
Saint Kitts and Nevis Coast Guard	Warrant officer class 1		Warrant officer class 2		Chief petty officer	Petty officer		Leading rate			Able rate
Saint Lucia	No navy
Saint Vincent and the Grenadines	No navy
Samoa	No navy
Seychelles Coast Guard											No insignia
Seychelles Coast Guard	Warrant officer class 1		Warrant officer class 2		Staff sergeant	Sergeant		Corporal		Lance corporal	Private (or equivalent)
Sierra Leone Navy
Sierra Leone Navy	Warrant officer class 1		Warrant officer class 2		Chief petty officer	Petty officer		Leading seaman			Able seaman	Seaman
Republic of Singapore Navy												No Insignia	No Insignia
Republic of Singapore Navy	Master sergeant		Staff sergeant		First sergeant	Second sergeant	Third sergeant	Corporal first class	Corporal	Lance corporal	Private first class	Private	Recruit
Solomon Islands	No navy
South African Navy
South African Navy	Warrant officer class 1		Warrant officer class 2		Chief petty officer	Petty officer		Leading seaman			Able seaman	Seaman
South Sudan	No navy
Sudanese Navy											No insignia
Sudanese Navy			مساعد; Mosa'id		رقيب أول; Raqib awwal	رقيب; Raqib		عريف 'arif		وكيل عريف; Wakil 'arif	جندي; Jundiun
Tanzania Naval Command											No insignia
Tanzania Naval Command	Afisa mteule daraja la kwanza		Afisa mteule daraja la pili		Sajinitaji	Sajenti		Koplo		Koplo usu	Mtu ndege
Tongan Navy											No insignia
Tongan Navy	Warrant officer class 1		Warrant officer class 2		Staff sergeant	Sergeant		Corporal		Lance corporal	Private
Trinidad and Tobago Coast Guard											No insignia	No insignia
Trinidad and Tobago Coast Guard	Fleet chief petty officer		Chief petty officer			Petty officer		Leading seaman			Able seaman	Ordinary seaman
Tuvalu	No navy
Uganda	No navy
Royal Navy
Royal Navy	Warrant officer class 1		Warrant officer class 2		Chief petty officer	Petty officer		Leading rate			Able rate
United States Navy												No insignia
United States Navy	Command master chief petty officer	Master chief petty officer	Command senior chief petty officer	Senior chief petty officer	Chief petty officer	Petty officer first class	Petty officer second class	Petty officer third class		Seaman	Seaman apprentice	Seaman recruit
Vanuatu Maritime Wing
Vanuatu Maritime Wing					Senior sergeant Long sajen	Sergeant; Sajen		Corporal; Kofol			Constable; Polis	Recruit; Rikrut
Zambia	No navy
Zimbabwe	No navy
Rank group	Senior NCOs							Junior NCOs			Enlisted
