= Military ranks of Liberia =

The Military ranks of Liberia are the military insignia used by the Armed Forces of Liberia. Liberia shares a rank structure similar to that of the United States Armed Forces.

== Commissioned officer ranks ==
The rank insignia of commissioned officers.

Rank group	General / flag officers			Senior officers			Junior officers
Liberian Ground Forces
Liberian Ground Forces	Lieutenant general	Major general	Brigadier general	Colonel	Lieutenant colonel	Major	Captain	First lieutenant	Second lieutenant
Liberian National Coast Guard
Liberian National Coast Guard				Captain	Commander	Lieutenant commander	Lieutenant	Lieutenant (junior grade)	Ensign
Liberian Air Wing
Liberian Air Wing				Colonel	Lieutenant colonel	Major	Captain	Lieutenant	Second lieutenant
Rank group	General / flag officers			Senior officers			Junior officers

== Other ranks ==
The rank insignia of non-commissioned officers and enlisted personnel.

Rank group	Senior NCOs					Junior NCOs		Enlisted
Liberian Ground Forces									No insignia
Liberian Ground Forces	Command sergeant major	Master sergeant	Sergeant first class	Staff sergeant	Sergeant	Corporal	Private first class	Private	Private
Liberian National Coast Guard
Liberian National Coast Guard	Master chief petty officer	Senior chief petty officer	Chief petty officer	Petty officer first class	Petty officer second class	Petty officer third class	Seaman	Seaman recruit
Liberian Air Wing
Liberian Air Wing	Chief master sergeant	Master sergeant	Technical sergeant	Staff sergeant	Senior airman/woman	Airman/woman first class	Airman/woman	Airman/woman basic
Rank group	Senior NCOs					Junior NCOs		Enlisted
