= 23rd Infantry Brigade (Liberia) =

- Seal of the Liberian 23rd Infantry Brigade
- Founded: 2008
- Country: Liberia
- Type: Ground forces
- Garrison/HQ: Barclay Training Center, Monrovia
- Nickname(s): AFL Brigade
- Anniversaries: February 11 (Armed Forces Day)
- Engagements: First Liberian Civil War; Second Liberian Civil War

Commanders
- Commander-in-Chief: President Joseph Boakai
- Brigade Commander: Colonel Theophilus Anto Dana, Jr.
- 1st Battalion Commander: Major Korboi Ballah Sallie
- 2nd Battalion Commander: Major Blaselee M. Wilson

The 23rd Infantry Brigade is a Liberian military unit that serves as the ground force component of the Armed Forces of Liberia. Commanded by a colonel, it consists of two infantry battalions under the 23rd Infantry Brigade and supporting units.

== Structure ==
- HQ
- 1st Infantry Battalion (located at Edward Beyan Kesselly Military Barracks in Margibi County)
    - Headquarters Company
    - Alpha Company
    - Bravo Company
    - Charlie Company
    - Combat Support Company
- 2nd Infantry Battalion (Also at Edward Beyan Kesselly Military Barracks)
  - Headquarters Company
  - Alpha Company
  - Bravo Company
  - Charlie Company
  - Combat Support Company

=== 2nd Battalion ===
The first commander of the battalion was Lieutenant Colonel Emmanuel Larbi Sarpong Gyadu of Ghana Army.

== History ==
The Liberian National Guard Brigade was at the heart of the pre-coup True Whig Party era army. After the First Liberian Civil War; the Second Liberian Civil War, the arrival of UNMIL, and the United States State Department's Liberian Security Sector Reform program, run by contractors, the Armed Forces of Liberia was effectively recreated from nothing from 2005.

The 23rd Infantry Brigade was formed on August 29, 2008, at the Barclay Training Center in Monrovia, and the 2nd Battalion, 23rd Infantry Brigade in December that year. Both battalions are currently based at the former Camp Schiefflin, which has now been renamed the Edward Binyah Kesselly Barracks, often known simply as 'EBK Barracks.'

As a result of the concentration of troops at EBK, the camp was overcrowded, and disturbances among the soldiers have occurred. As of mid-2009, the Ministry of Defense is attempting to alleviate the problem by relocating some personnel to Camp Tubman in Gbarnga.

The two battalions and supporting units went through training and preparation for an assessment exercise, a modified US Army Readiness Training Evaluation Program (ARTEP), which was held in late 2009. The force operates according to slightly modified United States Army practices, and uses U.S. doctrine.

"..The first battalion started the United States Army Training and Evaluation Programme, which it will complete in September [2009], while the second battalion will complete the programme in December [2009]. At that time, the United States contractors currently training and equipping the force will hand over to the Ministry of National Defense, which will assume responsibility for training and standing up the new army. The United States has indicated that it plans to assign as many as 60 United States serving military personnel to continue mentoring the Armed Forces of Liberia, beginning in January 2010."

== Operations ==
The unit was deployed during Operation Restore Hope in June 2012 at the Ivorian border in a Joint Task Force (JTF) with other security agencies like the Liberian National Police (LNP), the Liberian Immigration Service (LIS) and the Drug Enforcement Agency (DEA).
