= Corruption in Liberia =

Corruption in Liberia is endemic at every level of society, making the nation one of the most politically corrupt nations in the world. As such, corruption is not specifically a punishable crime under Liberian law, which further exacerbates the nature of corruption present in the country. When President Sirleaf took office in 2006, she announced that corruption was “the major public enemy.”

In 2014, Deborah Malac, at the time the US ambassador to Liberia, stated that "Corruption remains a serious problem in Liberia. It undermines transparency, accountability, and people's confidence in government institutions."

== Corruption dynamics ==
In the US State Department's 2013 Human Rights Report on Liberia, it was highlighted that corruption is not a crime in Liberia, although there are criminal penalties for economic sabotage, mismanagement of funds, and other corruption-related acts. According to a 2013 report published by the US State Department, low pay levels for the Liberian civil service, minimal job training, and lack of successful prosecutions have exacerbated official corruption and helped foster a culture of impunity.

== Extent of corruption ==
=== Government officials ===
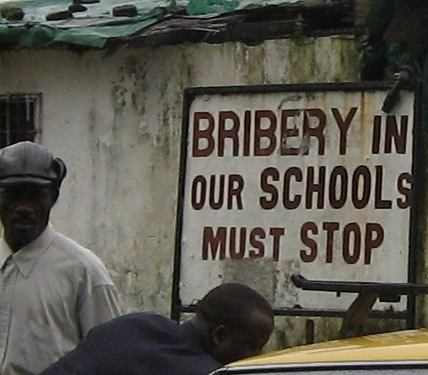
An anti-corruption sign in Liberia, 2004.

On Transparency International's 2025 Corruption Perceptions Index, Liberia scored 28 on a scale from 0 ("highly corrupt") to 100 ("very clean"). When ranked by score, Liberia ranked 136th among the 182 countries in the Index, where the country ranked first is perceived to have the most honest public sector. For comparison with regional scores, the best score among sub-Saharan African countries (Note: Angola, Benin, Botswana, Burkina Faso, Burundi, Cameroon, Cape Verde, Central African Republic, Chad, Comoros, Côte d'Ivoire, Democratic Republic of the Congo, Djibouti, Equatorial Guinea, Eritrea, Eswatini, Ethiopia, Gabon, Gambia, Ghana, Guinea, Guinea-Bissau, Kenya, Lesotho, Liberia, Madagascar, Malawi, Mali, Mauritania, Mauritius, Mozambique, Namibia, Niger, Nigeria, Republic of the Congo, Rwanda, Sao Tome and Principe, Senegal, Seychelles, Sierra Leone, Somalia, South Africa, South Sudan, Sudan, Tanzania, Togo, Uganda, Zambia, and Zimbabwe.) was 68, the average was 32 and the worst was 9. For comparison with worldwide scores, the best score was 89 (ranked 1), the average was 42, and the worst was 9 (ranked 181, in a two-way tie).

In 2012, the Liberian central government dismissed or suspended a number of officials for corruption. Auditor General Robert L. Kilby and General Services Agency Director General Pealrine Davis-Parkinson were dismissed for conflicts of interest.

Deputy Justice Minister Freddie Taylor, Deputy Bureau of Immigration and Naturalization (BIN) Commissioner Robert Buddy, former solicitor general Micah Wright, and BIN Border Patrol Chief Wilson Garpeh were dismissed for alleged involvement in human trafficking.

Deputy Public Works Minister Victor B. Smith was suspended for allegedly violating the law but was reinstated a week later following an investigation. President Sirleaf dismissed the chairman and other board members of the Liberia Airports Authority amid corruption allegations. An assistant labor minister was also dismissed for issuing work permits to foreigners after allegedly taking bribes.

=== Liberian legal system ===
A 2013 US State Department report said that: "Judges were susceptible to bribes to award damages in civil cases. Judges sometimes request bribes to try cases, release detainees from prison, or find defendants not guilty in criminal cases. Defense attorneys and prosecutors sometimes suggested defendants pay bribes to secure favorable rulings from or to appease judges, prosecutors, jurors, and police officers."

In 2012, the Liberia National Police (LNP) "investigated reports of police misconduct or corruption, and authorities suspended or dismissed several LNP officers."

In 2013, Human Rights Watch released a report specifically about police corruption in Liberia. They interviewed more than 120 people who had said they had been victimized in their dealings with the police. They said that "police officers typically ask crime victims to pay to register their cases, for transport to the crime scene, and for pens and other items used in the investigation. Criminal suspects routinely pay bribes for release from police detention."

Street vendors said they were often the victims of police raids, especially in Monrovia. Vendors said that police routinely steal goods, arrest vendors, and then require them to pay for their release from detention. Motorcycle and taxi drivers throughout the country described harassment and extortion along roads. Those who refuse to meet officers’ demands face violence and arrest. Elite armed units, such as the Police Support Unit, were frequently cited for violent abuses.

Human Rights Watch also interviewed 35 police officers of varying ranks for their study. The police described being given inadequate supplies, living on low salaries, and being pressured to pay their superiors to obtain desirable posts and promotions.

=== Education system ===
In Liberia's education system, patronage and bribery by administrators, professors, and students are widely reported. Abuse of resources, teacher absenteeism, and sex for grades are common. A culture of silence prevents the reporting of problems and, hence, any constructive reform.

In 2013, a confidential anonymous SMS suggestions box for students and educators began to operate in elements of Liberia's education system, in order to report systemic abuses.

In 2014, the head of Liberia's National Commission on Higher Education was under investigation by Liberia's Anti-Corruption Commission for a second time, over allegations of the embezzlement of funds supposedly spent upon official travel, which never occurred. The National Commission on Higher Education coordinates, monitors, evaluates and accredits all higher institutions of learning.

=== Medical system ===
Amidst Liberia's Ebola epidemic in 2014, some body-collection teams dispatched to collect the Ebola dead accepted bribes to issue falsified death certificates to family members, stating that their dead relative died from something other than Ebola. The body of the Ebola victim could also be left with relatives. Ebola carries a stigma in Liberia, and some families do not want to admit that their relatives died of Ebola. Another factor is that families wish to give their relatives a traditional burial. An American NGO journalist reported that Liberian police threatened arrest and demanded bribes in order for him to be able to leave the Médecins Sans Frontières compound.

== Anti-corruption efforts ==
The Liberian Anti-Corruption Commission (LACC) and the Ministry of Justice are responsible for exposing and combating official corruption.

=== Liberian Anti-Corruption Commission ===
An underfunded and understaffed Liberian Anti-Corruption Commission, created in 2008, is supposedly empowered to prosecute crimes that effectively amount to corruption. Human Rights Watch (HRW) noted in 2011 that though there had been a multiplicity of high-level corruption scandals during the previous year, they had resulted in "few investigations and only two convictions." In 2013, the LACC received 25 cases, investigated 23, and recommended 4 for prosecution. There were no convictions.

The Anti-Corruption Commission, HRW complained, is "hampered by insufficient funds [and] personnel" and does not actually have the "authority to independently prosecute cases." The failure of Sirleaf to deal with this issue has led to "the perception that the president lacks the will to address the problem," it said.

In her final State of the Nation address in 2017, President Sirleaf stated that corruption in Liberia was too great for her administration to eliminate.

=== Financial disclosure ===
The 2013 US State Department report noted that President Sirleaf issued Executive Order 38 in January 2012, requesting officials of the executive branch to make financial disclosures and declare their assets to the LACC. Many officials only did so after the president threatened dismissal if they did not comply. All officials of the executive branch declared their assets by year’s end.

The LACC initiated an asset verification process to review these declarations and, in October 2012, summarized the results of the process, highlighting some discrepancies and instances of unexplained wealth accumulation. The LACC was not required to release the contents of the declarations, but it released aggregate information about officials' cooperation and the overall results of the asset verification process.

=== Transparency of government ===
The 2010 Freedom of Information Act (FOIA) provides that the government should release government information not involving national security or military issues upon request. Some transparency advocates, including the head of the LACC, have suggested that the FOIA law needs to be improved to ensure that citizens can access information to verify that government funds were properly spent and accounted for.

== See also ==
- Crime in Liberia
