= Todee District =

District in Montserrado County, Liberia

Coordinates: 6.596°N 10.485°W

Todee District is one of four districts located in Montserrado County, Liberia. There was a former Armed Forces of Liberia base there housing the Tubman Military Academy and Second Infantry Battalion in 1984 and there have been discussions post-2003 of rebuilding the base.
