= Armed Forces of Liberia =

Combined military forces of Liberia

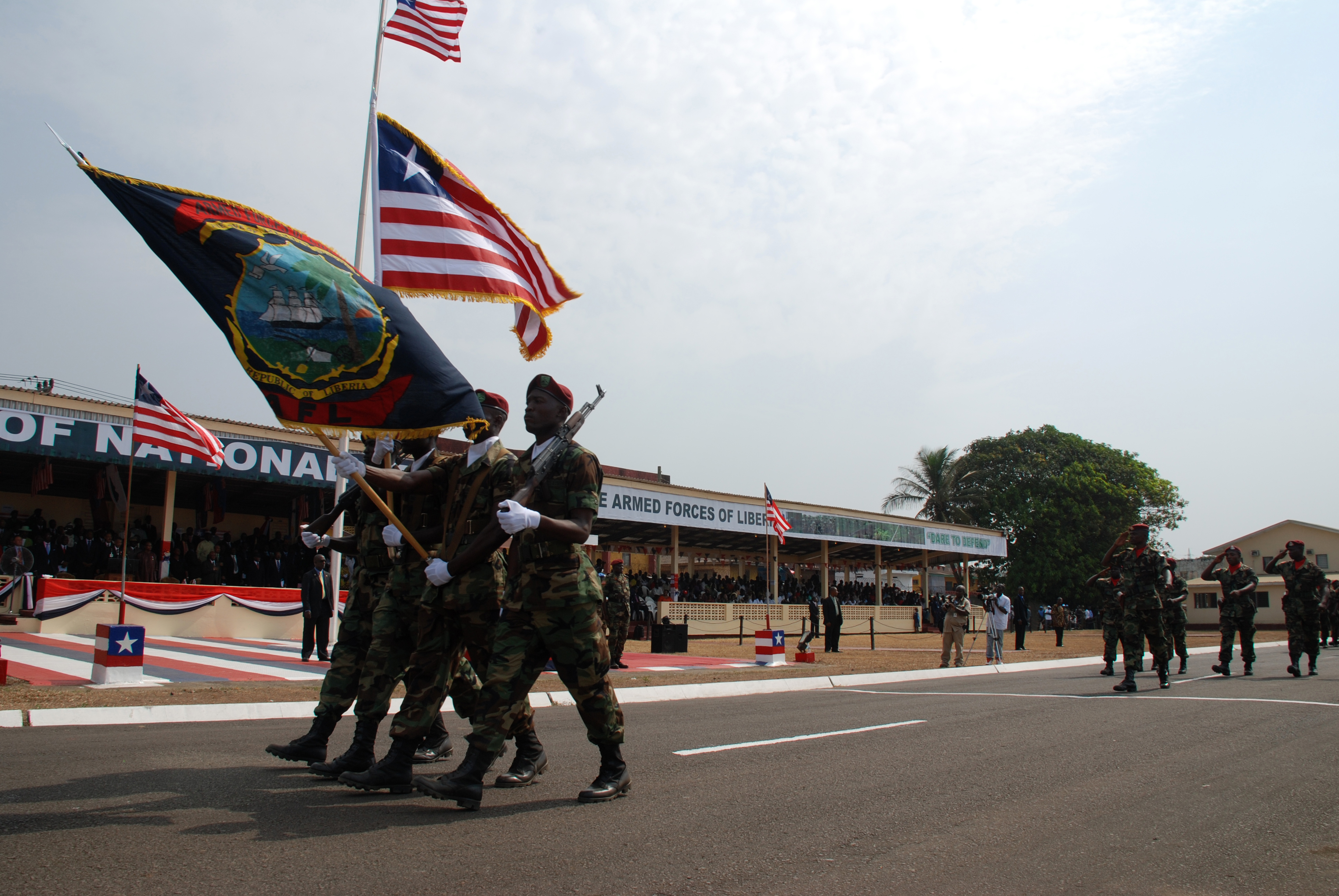
- A Liberian color guard marches on Armed Forces Day in 2010.
- Motto: "Building a Force For Good" (unofficial)
- Founded: 1847 (Liberian militia); 1908 (Liberian Frontier Force)
- Current form: 2006
- Service branches: 23rd Infantry Brigade; Air Wing; National Coast Guard
- Headquarters: Monrovia

Leadership
- Commander-in-Chief: President Joseph Boakai
- Minister of National Defense: Geraldine J. George
- Chief of Staff: Brigadier General Davidson Fayiah Forleh

Personnel
- Active personnel: 2,100 (establishment)

Expenditure
- Budget: US$12.9 million (FY 2013–14)
- Percent of GDP: 0.74%

Industry
- Foreign suppliers: Canada; United States; United Kingdom; Poland; Russia

Related articles
- Ranks: Military ranks of Liberia

The Armed Forces of Liberia (AFL) are the armed forces of the Republic of Liberia. Tracing its origins to a militia that was formed by the first black colonists in what is now Liberia, it was founded as the Liberian Frontier Force in 1908, and retitled in 1956. For almost all of its history, the AFL has received considerable materiel and training assistance from the United States. For most of the 1941–89 period, training was largely provided by U.S. advisers, though this assistance has not prevented the same generally low levels of effectiveness common to most of the armed forces in the developing world.

For most of the Cold War, the AFL saw little action, apart from a reinforced company group which was sent to ONUC in the Democratic Republic of the Congo in the 1960s. This changed with the advent of the First Liberian Civil War in 1989. The AFL became entangled in the conflict, which lasted from 1989 to 1996–97, and then the Second Liberian Civil War, which lasted from 1999 to 2003.

As of 2014, the AFL consists of an infantry brigade, an air wing, and the coast guard. For several years after the war, a Nigerian Army officer served as head of the armed forces.

11 February is Armed Forces Day, having been proclaimed in 2011.

== Legal standing ==
The New National Defense Act of 2008 was approved on August 21, 2008. It repeals the National Defense Act of 1956, the Coast Guard Act of 1959, and the Liberian Navy Act of 1986. The duties and functions of the AFL are officially stated as follows:

- Section 2.3(a): The primary mission of the AFL shall be to defend the national sovereignty and territorial integrity of Liberia, including land, air and maritime territory, against external aggressions, insurgency, terrorism and encroachment. In addition thereto the AFL shall respond to natural disasters and engage in other civic works as may be required or directed.
- Section 2.3(b): The AFL shall also participate in international peacekeeping peace enforcement and other by the UN, the AU, ECOWAS, MRU, and/or all international institutions of which Liberia may be a member. All such activities shall be undertaken only upon authorization of the President of Liberia with the consent of the Legislature.
- Section 2.3(c): The AFL shall provide command, communications, logistical, medical, transportation, and humanitarian support to the civil authority in the event of a natural or man-made disaster, outbreak of disease, or epidemic. Such assistance shall be authorized by the President of Liberia.
- Section 2.3(d): The AFL shall assist civil authorities in search, rescue, and saving of life on land, sea, or air; such assistance shall be authorized by the President for immediate response by specialized search and rescue units in conjunction with other Government Ministries and Agencies.
- Section 2.3(e): The duties of the AFL in peacetime shall include support to the national law enforcement agencies when such support is requested and approved by the President. Such support shall include exchange of information, personnel training, and mobilization and deployment of security contingents. At no time during peacetime however, shall the AFL engage in law enforcement within Liberia, such function being the prerogative of the Liberia National Police and other law enforcement agencies. Notwithstanding, the Military Police of the AFL may, on request of the Ministry of Justice made to the Ministry of National Defense, and approved by the President of Liberia, provide assistance to these law enforcement agencies as determined by prevailing situations. The AFL shall intervene only as a last resort, when the threat exceeds the capability of the law enforcement agencies to respond.
- Section 2.5: Standards of Conduct for the Armed Forces of Liberia: Members of the AFL shall perform their duties at all times in accordance with democratic values and human rights. They shall perform their duties in a non-partisan manner, obey all lawful orders and commands from their superior officers in ways that command citizen respect and confidence and contribute towards the maintenance and promotion of the respect for the rule of law.

== History ==
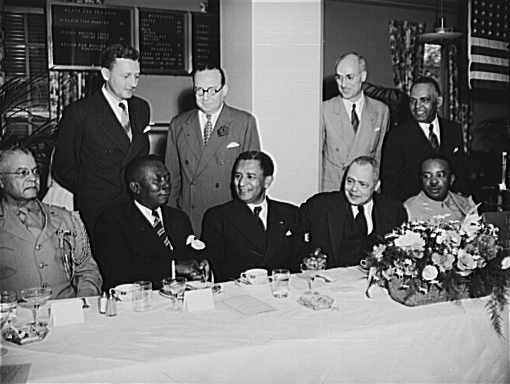
Chief of the Liberian Frontier Force, Captain Alford Russ (seated far right) sits alongside members of President Barclay's party during the Liberian President's visit to Washington DC in 1943.

The modern Armed Forces of Liberia grew out of a militia that was formed by the first black colonists from the United States. The militia was first formed when in August 1822 an attack was feared on Cape Mesurado (where Monrovia now is) and the agent of the settlements directed the mobilization of all "able-bodied males into a militia and declared martial law." By 1846, the size of the militia had grown to two regiments. Following independence in 1847, the militia continued to serve as the country's defense force Following the model of the United States Army. In 1900, Liberian men between the ages of sixteen and fifty were considered liable for service in the militia. The militia also had a navy consisting of two small gunboats. In the 1850s, the Liberian president requested naval support from the British government to transport Liberian troops to the Gallinas territory to punish Liberians there who persisted in slave trafficking.

On February 6, 1908, the militia was established on a permanent basis as the 500-strong Liberian Frontier Force (LFF). The LFF's original mission was "to patrol the border in the Hinterland [against British and French territorial ambitions] and to prevent disorders." The LFF was initially placed under the command of British Major MacKay Cadell, who was quickly replaced under threat of arms after he complained the Force was not being properly paid.

In 1912, the United States established military ties with Liberia by sending some five black American officers to help reorganize the force. The LFF in its early years was frequently recruited by inducing men from the interior forcibly. When dispatched to the interior to quell tribal unrest, units often lived off the areas that they were pacifying, as a form of communal punishment. The Force's officers were drawn from either the coastal aristocracy or tribal elites.

=== World Wars ===
Liberia joined the Allies in both World War I and World War II. The only troops dispatched overseas were a few individuals to France during World War I, and reported volunteers under U.S. command in World War II, but none served in combat in either war. A law of 20 February 1940 stipulated that the armed forces of the Republic "shall consist ..of the Frontier Force, of twelve companies ..the Militia, ..and the Militia Reserve." During World War II, U.S. involvement in the country increased greatly. A steady supply of rubber from the world's largest rubber plantation, operated at Harbel by the Firestone Company since 1926 was vital. Thus the US government built roads, created an international airport (known as Robertsfield), and transformed the capital by building a deep water port (the Freeport of Monrovia). Black ("Colored") United States Army troops of the 41st Engineer General Service Regiment arrived from June 1942 as members of Task Force 5889. During the war, funding provided by the United States allowed an increase in the Frontier Force's strength to around 1,500. The armed forces came to rely almost exclusively on American assistance in terms of training, with non-US training "tend[ing] to be brief and uninspired [with little] accomplished other than some desultory close-order drill."

As a result of American arms sales, by the 1920s Liberian forces were equipped with the American Krag and Peabody rifles, as well as German Mausers.

U.S. Army Forces in Liberia (USAFIL) commanded by Brigadier General Percy Lee Sadler also established an officer candidate school during the later part of World War II, using U.S. Army instructors selected from the troops in the country. The school conducted two courses and graduated nearly 300 new officers. USAFIL was finally inactivated on 24 February 1946. Just under twenty years later in 1964, the group still made up over 50% of the officer corps of the AFL.

=== 1945–1980 ===
Members of the Liberian National Guard at the inauguration of President William Tolbert in 1976

From 1945 to 1964, the officers appointed were nearly all college graduates. From 1951, there was a US military mission based in Liberia to assist in training the AFL. A Reserve Officers' Training Corps was established in 1956 with units at the University of Liberia in Monrovia and the Booker Washington Institute in Kakata. By 1978 the program had been redesignated the Army Student Training Program (ASTP) and had a total of 46 students at the University of Liberia, the Booker Washington Institute, and three smaller institutions. However it was not until the late 1960s that the Tubman Military Academy was established in Todee District, upper Montserrado County, as an officer training facility.

The LFF was renamed as the Armed Forces of Liberia under the Amended National Defense Law of 1956, though other sources say February 1962, which appears to have been the date the land force became the Liberian National Guard. Liebenow says that the LFF was 'restyled the National Guard in 1962.' From this period, Liberia's armed forces consisted of the Liberian National Guard, the Liberian Militia, whose ostensible structure is depicted below, and the Liberian Coast Guard. Until 1980, by law every able-bodied male between the ages of 16 and 45 years was to serve in the militia, though this stipulation was not enforced.

On January 26, 1957, the Liberian Legislature set aside Feb 11, 1957, as Armed Forces Day. Speaking in 2012, Jonathan B. B. Hart, the Bishop of the Episcopal Church of Liberia recalled that "..the Sierra Leoneans were sent to Liberia to take over the army by the British government because it had given Liberia a loan." .. "The Sierra Leonean commanders took orders from the British government and not the President of Liberia, then Arthur Barclay. When they began to misbehave, the army was turned over to a Liberian who refused. It was during that time that some soldiers took to the streets in demand of salary arrears, so soldiers getting in the streets.. in demand of salary is not new."

At the start of the 1960s, Liberia dispatched troops, including a movement control unit, to support ONUC during the Congo Crisis, and were airlifted into the Congo by the United States Air Force. The Liberian troops were initially in Équateur province. In 1961, during their first combat action in the country, 300 Liberian troops repelled an attack by 5,000 Baluba tribesmen and their European officers.

The National Guard was not a high status force: "It was a skeleton bigade of soldiers who were predominantly from the lower economic and social stratum of society. They were poorly paid, and had less than decent facilities for accommodation and care." Despite this, a Liberian company, designated the Reinforced Security Company, was contributed to the United Nations Operation in the Congo in the early 1960s. Six rotations were made. The 1964 US Army Area Handbook described the company's actions as "...After a poor start, the performance of the contingent improved steadily; the last company, which returned home in May 1963, had performed creditably and, by its conduct and appearance, gave the impression of being a well-trained and disciplined military organization."

Liebenow writes that the head of the National Guard was arrested, along with others, in February 1963, to forestall an alleged coup, and that Tubman had announced that following the labour strikes of 1966, a foreign power had attempted to bribe army officers to stage a coup. In addition, Albert T. White, Commanding Officer of the LNG, was 'rusticated' by Tubman to become the Superintendent of Grand Gedeh County in 1966, though he was later 'rehabilitated'.

In 1964 the US Army Area Handbook described the National Guard as 3,000 strong with a headquarters company, the Executive Mansion Guard Battalion in Monrovia, three infantry battalions and one engineer battalion (which was newly formed at Camp Naama in 1962 and only had one company organized). The three infantry battalions were the 1st Infantry Battalion, at Camp Schiefflin, situated on the airport road between Monrovia and Roberts International Airport, the 2nd Infantry Battalion, HQ at Barclay Training Center (BTC), Monrovia, and the 3rd Infantry Battalion, HQ at Baworobo, Maryland County.

By 1978, the LNG Brigade had been established and the brigade was described as comprising a Headquarters and Headquarters Company at the Barclay Training Center, Monrovia, the Executive Mansion Guard Battalion on Capitol Hill, Monrovia, the Engineer Battalion and the First Field Artillery Battalion (both at Camp Jackson, Naama) two tactical combat battalions (the First Infantry Battalion, at Schiefflin and the Second Infantry Battalion which in the intervening period had moved from the BTC to Camp Tolbert, Todee) and three non-tactical battalions, tasked with providing guard services to government officials, tax collection, and 'other non-military duties'.

The Third Infantry Battalion covered Montserrado, Grand Cape Mount, and Grand Bassa counties from BTC. The Fourth Infantry Battalion covered Grand Gedeh, Sinoe and Maryland counties from Camp Whisnant, Zwedru. The Fifth Infantry Battalion was at Gbarnga.

Other field units of the brigade were the Armoured Unit, at Camp Ram Rod, Paynesward City (possibly Paynesville), Monrovia, and the Bella Yella Special Detachment, Camp Bella Yella, Lofa. Bella Yella was of course the location of the feared Bella Yella prison. The Service Support Battalion was located at BTC, and comprised the Medical Company, the Brigade Band, the Brigade Special Unit (a parade unit) and the Military Police Unit. Also at BTC was the Logistical Command, consisting of a depot, arsenal (whose location had been declared unsafe), the AFL Quartermaster Corps, and the AFL Transportation Company. Strength was reported to be 4,822 in 1978.

The Liberian Militia
Organization of the Liberian Militia, according to the National Defense Law 1956

Two Divisional Headquarters

- First Brigade
  - First Regiment
  - Fifth Regiment
  - Sixth Regiment
  - Tenth Regiment
- Third Brigade
  - Fourth Regiment
  - Eighth Regiment
  - Ninth Regiment
  - Fifteenth Regiment
  - Sixth Regiment
- Second Brigade
  - Second Regiment
  - Third Regiment
  - Eleventh Regiment
  - Fourteenth Regiment
- Fourth Brigade
  - Seventh Regiment
  - Thirteenth Regiment
  - Sixteenth Regiment
  - Seventeenth Regiment

While militia service was compulsory by law for all eligible males, the law was only enforced in a lax manner. From the mid-1960s, and in its later years, members of the militia met only quarterly for sparsely attended drill practice. Estimates of men enrolled over the years vary. The 1964 US Army Area Handbook said that "some 20,000 men are estimated to be enrolled." The IISS estimated militia numbers at 5,000 in 1967 and 6,000 in 1970.

By the early 1970s the militia reported a strength of some 4,000 poorly trained and ill-equipped men. The 1978 Annual Report of the Liberian Ministry of National Defense said that "The various militia regiments, in accordance with the law, held quarterly parades. ...Furthermore, the entire Regiments were out in full strength during burial occasions." By the time it was disbanded in 1980, the militia was considered to be completely ineffective as a military force.

The armed forces' third arm, the Liberian National Coast Guard, was established in 1959. Throughout the Tubman period the coastguard was little more than a few sometimes unserviceable patrol craft crewed by ill-trained personnel, though its training improved in the 1980s to the point where it was considered the best trained of the armed services.

From 1952 onwards, Chiefs of Staff of the AFL included Major General Alexander Harper (1952–54), Lieutenant General Abraham Jackson (1954–60), Albert T. White (1964–65), Lieutenant General George T. Washington (late 1960s), Lieutenant General Henry Johnson (1970–74), Lieutenant General Franklin Smith, and Lieutenant General Henry Dubar (1980–1990).

When William Tolbert replaced the long-serving William Tubman as president in 1971, he retired more than 400 aging soldiers. Sawyer comments that "retired soldiers were replaced by young recruits from urban areas, many of whom were then poorly trained at the Tubman Military Academy. This development dramatically changed the character of the military in Liberia." (Samuel Doe was among this group.) Amos Sawyer also comments that "recruitment of such individuals for the military was part of Tolbert's efforts to replace aging, illiterate soldiers with younger, literate men who were capable of absorbing technical and professional training."

=== Doe regime (1980–1990) ===
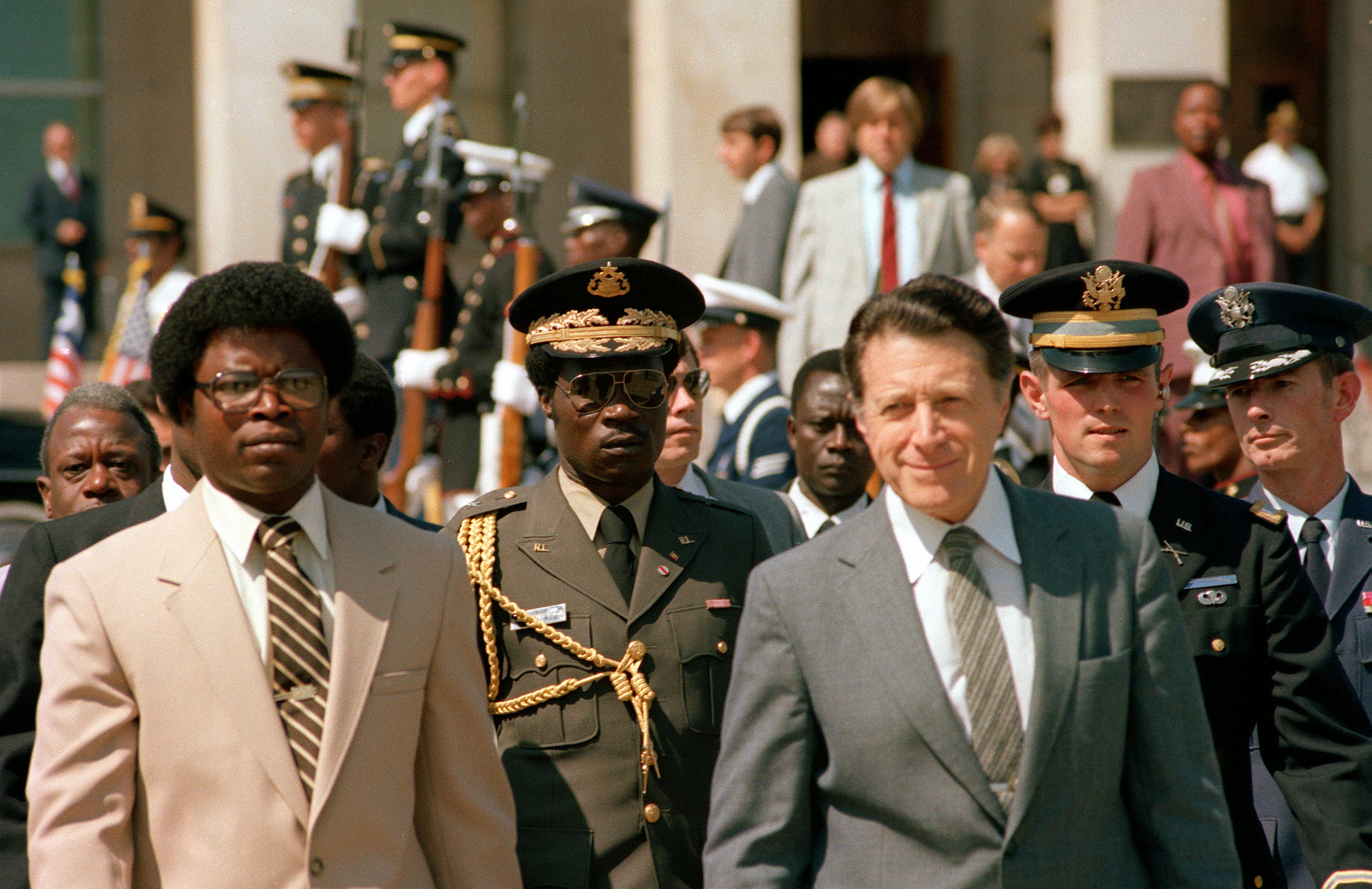
President Samuel Doe with United States Secretary of Defense Caspar Weinberger during a visit to Washington DC in 1982

The AFL became involved in politics when seventeen soldiers launched a coup on April 12, 1980. The group was made up of Master Sergeant Samuel Doe, two staff sergeants, four sergeants, eight corporals, and two privates. They found President Tolbert sleeping in his office in the Executive Mansion and there they killed him. While then-Sergeant Thomas Quiwonkpa led the plotters, it was the group led by Samuel Doe that found Tolbert in his office, and it was Doe, as the highest ranking of the group, who went on the radio the next day to announce the overthrow of the long-entrenched True Whig Party government.

Doe became Head of State and co-chair of the new People's Redemption Council government. Quiwonkpa became commander of the army and the other co-chair of the PRC. (In the aftermath of the coup, the title of LNG Brigade commanding general was confusingly changed to commanding general of the AFL, reporting to the chief of staff, and it was this position that Quiwonkpa inherited.) Henry Dubar (who had helped recruit Doe personally years before) was promoted in one leap from captain to lieutenant general as chief of staff. From 1980 onward, Doe's systematic promotion of ethnic Krahn to sensitive posts in the government and military, began to drive deepening divisions within the AFL, among others with Quiwonkpa's Gio tribe, and to hamper morale.

"... Military discipline was an early casualty of the coup. The revolt had been an enlisted men's affair, and one of the first instructions broadcast over the radio had ordered soldiers not to obey their officers. Over four years later, according to observers, the reluctance of most officers to impose discipline had combined with the unwillingness of more than a few enlisted men to accept it."

The launch of Doe's coup meant that Major William Jarbo, another soldier with political ambitions who was said to have excellent connections to U.S. security officials, had his takeover plans forestalled. He tried to escape abroad but was hunted down and killed by the new government. The junta started to split in 1983, with Doe telling Quiwonkpa that he was planning to move Quiwonkpa from command of the army to a position as secretary-general of the People's Redemption Council. Unhappy with this proposed change, Quiwonkpa fled into exile in late 1983, along with his aide-de-camp Prince Johnson. In 1984 the AFL included the Liberian National Guard (LNG) Brigade and related units (6,300 men), and the Liberian National Coast Guard (about 450 men). The brigade, formed between 1964 and 1978, was based at the Barclay Training Center (BTC) in Monrovia, and was composed of six infantry battalions, a military engineer battalion (which circa 1974 under the command of Colonel Robert M. Blamo completed an airstrip at Belefania Town), a field artillery battalion (the First Field Artillery Battalion, reportedly at Camp Naama in Bong County) and a support battalion.

Three of the infantry units—the First Infantry Battalion, stationed at Camp Schieffelin, the Second Infantry Battalion at Camp Todee in northern Montserrado County, and the Sixth Infantry Battalion at Bomi Hills—were tactical elements designed to operate against hostile forces. The other battalions, the Third Infantry Battalion based at the Barclay Training Centre in Monrovia, the Fourth Infantry Battalion at Zwedru in Grand Gedeh County, and the Fifth Infantry Battalion at Gbarnga in Bong County served mostly as providers of personnel for non-military duties. Soldiers in these units were used extensively as policemen, customs and immigration officials, and as tax collectors.

=== Attempted coup (1985) ===
In the aftermath of the rigged elections of 1985, which Doe manipulated to solidify his power, Quiwonkpa returned from his U.S. exile to enter Liberia from Sierra Leone. On November 12, 1985, he entered Monrovia with a group of dissident soldiers, took over the national Liberia Broadcasting System radio station and announced that the 'National Patriotic Forces of Liberia' had seized power. Adekeye says that Quiwonkpa erred in 'fail[ing] to establish control over the country's communications system and resisted a frontal attack on the Executive Mansion.'

These mistakes allowed Doe the time to rally the Krahn-dominated Executive Mansion Guard and 1st Infantry Battalion from Camp Schieffelin to reestablish control. Quiwonkpa was captured, killed, and mutilated, his body being dismembered and parts eaten. In the aftermath of the attempted coup, purges took place in Monrovia and in Nimba County, Quiwonkpa's home, against those who had rejoiced after the coup announcement. As many as 1,500 people may have been killed. The AFL was purged of Gio soldiers.

Under Samuel Doe the Coast Guard was retitled the Liberian Navy in 1986 through the passage of The Liberian Navy Act of 1986. The Aviation Unit was founded in 1970 with the delivery of three Cessna U-17C light aircraft. An Aviation Unit aircraft crashed at Spriggs-Payne in 1984. In 1985 it operated three fixed-wing aircraft from Spriggs Payne Airport in Monrovia, including Cessna 172s. Their duties included reconnaissance and transport of light cargo and VIPs. The Aviation Unit was expanded in the 1980s with the delivery of more Cessna aircraft: three 172s, a 206, 207 and two single engined turboprop 208s.

The Liberian Air Force was established from the Aviation Unit by an Act of Legislature on August 12, 1987. Its statutory responsibilities were to: protect and defend the air space of the Republic of Liberia; protect lives and properties; provide air mobility for military and civil personnel; assist in search and rescue operations; undertake emergency operations; conduct reconnaissance patrols; participate in joint military operations and perform other duties as may be designated by the Ministry of Defense. The LAF was to be headed by a colonel in his capacity as Assistant Chief of Defense Staff for the Air Force and was mandated to do the following: to train personnel and develop doctrine; advise the Chief of Staff of the AFL on matters relating to the Air Force. In 1989 two refurbished DHC-4 Caribou, a single Piper Aztec light twin and three IAI Arava STOL twins were delivered.

=== First Liberian Civil War (1989–1997) ===
Charles Taylor invaded the country at Butuo in Nimba County on Christmas Eve 1989 with a force of around 150 men, initiating the First Liberian Civil War. Doe responded by sending two AFL battalions to Nimba in December 1989 – January 1990, under then-Colonel Hezekiah Bowen. The Liberian government forces assumed that most of the Mano and Gio peoples in the Nimba region were supporting the rebels. They thus acted in a very brutal and scorched-earth fashion which quickly alienated the local people. Taylor's support rose rapidly, as the Mano and Gio flocked to his National Patriotic Front of Liberia seeking revenge. Many government soldiers deserted, some to join the NPFL. The inability of the AFL to make any headway was one of the reasons why Doe changed his field commander in the area five times in the first six months of the war.

Field commanders apparently included Brigadier General Edward Smith. By May 1990 the AFL had been forced back to Gbarnga, still under the control of Bowen's troops, but they lost the town to a NPFL assault by the end of May 1990, at which time the NPFL also captured Buchanan on the coast. The NPFL had now gathered an estimated 10,000 fighters while the AFL, splintering, could only summon 2,000.

The revolt reached Monrovia by July 1990, and General Dubar left the country for exile in the United States. In place of Dubar, Brigadier General Charles Julu, former commander of the Executive Mansion Guard Battalion, was appointed Chief of Staff. Two Liberian Coast Guard vessels were sunk in the battles for the city. The NPFL had been distributing weapons to Gio civilians after it arrived in Nimba, where many were very interested in taking their revenge on the government after Doe had punished Nimba country for its support of Quiwonkpa in 1983 and 1985.

By July 1990 the government began to distribute weapons to civilians in turn, to Krahn and Mandingo who wished to protect themselves. These hastily enlisted civilians became known as '1990 soldiers.' A '1990 soldier' which the President had personally picked, Tailey Yonbu, led a massacre of refugees, mostly Gio and Mano civilians, on the night of July 29/30, 1990 at St. Peter's Lutheran Church in Sinkor, Monrovia. Some 600 were killed. Because of the previous ethnic purges carried out by Doe's forces, the conflict took on characteristics of an ethnic pogrom.

In August 1990 the Economic Community of West African States (ECOWAS) dispatched a peacekeeping force, ECOMOG, to Liberia. The force arrived at the Freeport of Monrovia on August 24, 1990, landing from Nigerian and Ghanaian vessels. By the time ECOMOG arrived, Prince Johnson's INPFL and Taylor's NPFL were fighting on the outside bounds of the port. A series of peacemaking conferences in regional capitals followed. There were meetings in Bamako in November 1990, Lome in January 1991, and Yamoussoukro in June–October 1991. The first seven peace conferences, including the Yamoussoukro I-IV processes and the Carter Center negotiation leading to the Cotonou Accords, failed due to lack of agreement between the warring factions. The NPFL launched an assault on Monrovia in 1992, which they named 'Operation Octopus.' The civil war lasted until the Abuja Accords of August 1996.

The AFL was confined to an enclave around the capital during the conflict, and did not play a significant part in the fighting. Elections in July 1997 finally brought Taylor to power. Under the accords, which led to a break in fighting in 1996 and the Liberian general election, 1997, ECOMOG was to retrain a new national army based on fair ethnic and geographical representation. Yet Taylor denied ECOMOG any role in the restructuring of the AFL, and the force eventually left Liberia by the end of 1998.

During the 1990–99 period, Chiefs of Staff included Lieutenant Colonel Davis S. Brapoh, Lieutenant General Hezekiah Bowen (later Minister of Defense), Lieutenant General A.M.V. Doumuyah, and Lieutenant General Kalilu Abe Kromah, appointed during the interim rule of the Council of State in 1996, who was chief of staff from May 1996 to April 1997. Following Kromah, Lieutenant General Prince C. Johnson was appointed, who died in October 1999 following a car accident.

=== Taylor regime (1997–2003) ===
Shortly after the induction of Taylor as elected president of Liberia in August 1997, the Ministry of National Defense determined that the strength of the AFL had risen during the war from 6,500 to 14,981 service members. To begin demobilization, the AFL Chief of Staff published Special Orders No. 1 on January 1, 1998, demobilizing and retiring 2,250 personnel. The demobilization process was delayed and badly managed, and only on April 22, 1998, did payments began to be issued to the demobilizing personnel, without prior explanation of what exactly the payments represented.

Demonstrations and protests by the demobilized personnel eventually led to a riot in which three died on May 5, 1998. As a result, Taylor authorised the formation of a commission to submit recommendations on how the AFL should be reorganized. The commission, led by Blamoh Nelson, Director of the Cabinet, submitted its report on December 17, 1998, recommending a 6,000-strong armed forces (5,160 Army, 600 Navy, and 240 Air Force) but the proposal was never implemented.

Instead Taylor ran down the Armed Forces, letting go 2,400–2,600 former personnel, many of whom were Krahn brought in by former President Doe, in December 1997 – January 1998, and building up instead the Anti-Terrorist Unit (ATU), the Special Operations Division of the Liberian National Police, and the Special Security Service. On November 19, 1999, Taylor named General Kpenkpah Konah as the new Chief of Staff of the AFL (where he would stay until 2006) and John Tarnue as head of the army. Tarnue was later implicated in a land dispute in 1999, while acting as AFL commander.

The International Crisis Group writes that the AFL was reduced practically to the point of non-existence by fall 2001, by which time a total of 4,000 personnel had been retired. The Second Liberian Civil War originated in clashes in April 1999 but was not a major threat to Taylor until 2000–01. However, on the government side the AFL played only a minor role; irregular ex National Patriotic Front of Liberia militias backed by more privileged Taylor partisans such as the Anti-Terrorist Unit saw most of the fighting.

As a result of the Civil War, all aircraft, equipment, materiel, and facilities belonging to the Liberian Air Force were badly damaged, rendering the force inoperable. During the Civil War the Taylor government made a variety of different air support arrangements; a seemingly inoperable Mil Mi-2 and Mil Mi-8, one in Anti-Terrorist Unit markings, could be seen at Spriggs Payne Airport in central Monrovia in mid-2005, apparently a hangover from the war. Meanwhile, during the Taylor era, the Navy consisted of a couple of small patrol craft. However, on shore, both late 1990s and 2005 sources indicate the Navy included the 2nd Naval District, Buchanan, the 3rd Naval District, Greenville, and the 4th Naval District, Harper.

=== Rebuilding the AFL ===
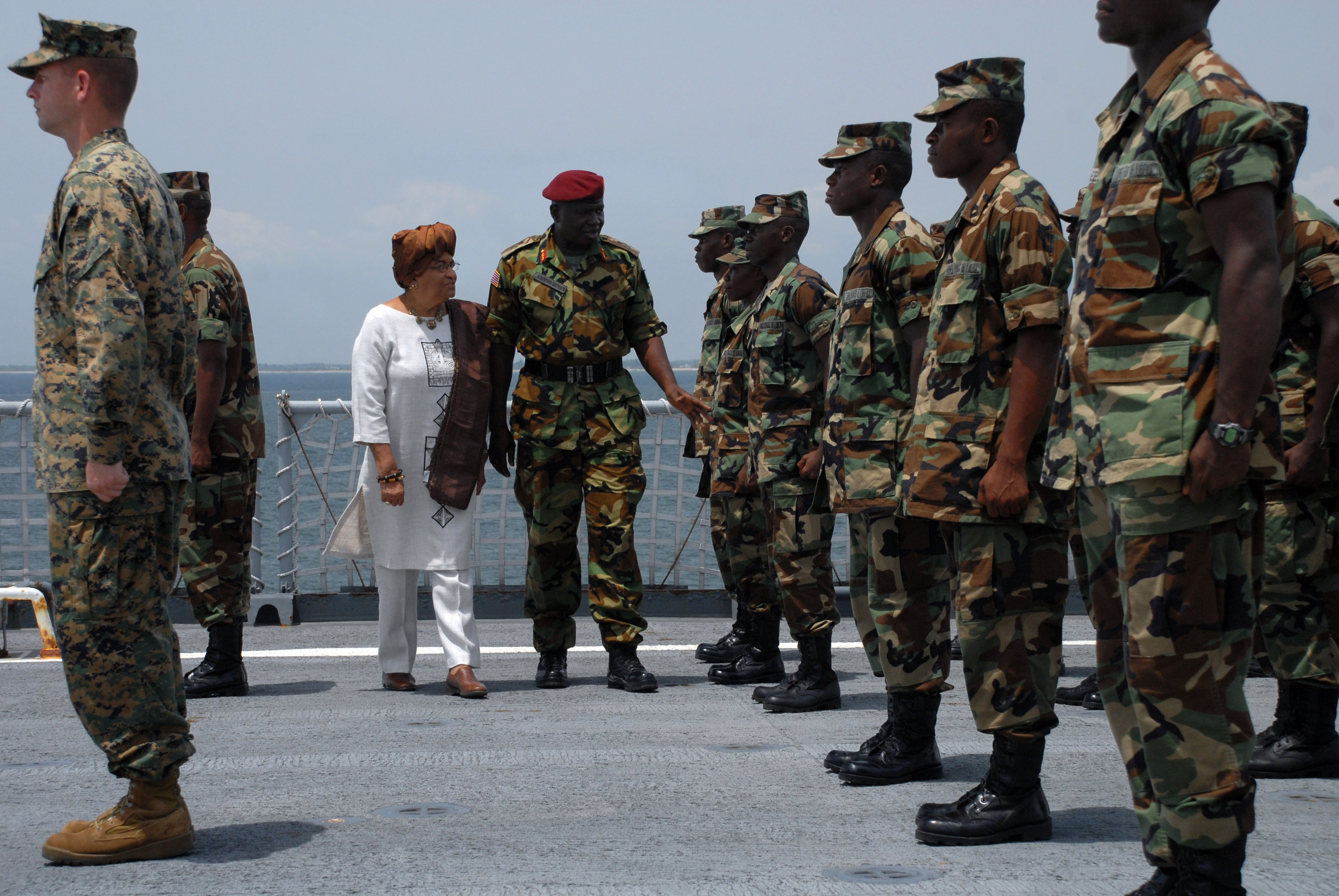
President Ellen Johnson Sirleaf inspecting AFL soldiers on board USS Fort McHenry in 2008

Part 4 (Articles VI and VII) of the August 2003 Accra Comprehensive Peace Agreement (CPA) which ended the Second Liberian Civil War addressed security sector reform. It declared that future recruits for the new AFL would be screened for their fitness for service as well as prior human rights violations, that the new force would be ethnically balanced and without political bias, and that the new force's mission would be to defend national sovereignty and "in extremis" respond to natural disasters.

By March 1, 2005, over a year after the war ended, the United Nations Mission in Liberia (UNMIL) had disarmed and demobilized 103,018 people who claimed to have fought for former president Charles Taylor or the two rebel groups, Liberians United for Reconciliation and Democracy (LURD) or the Movement for Democracy in Liberia (MODEL). That year most former AFL elements were concentrated at Camp Schiefflin. The previous AFL personnel, including those of the Navy and Air Force, were slowly retired with pensions obtained by the MND and international partners from a number of international donors.

In 2005, the United States provided funding for DynCorp International and Pacific Architects & Engineers, private military contractors, to train a new 4,000-man Liberian military. DynCorp was made responsible for individual training and PA&E unit training. In June–July 2005 the projected force strength was reduced to 2000 men. DynCorp and the U.S. Embassy scrutinized the personnel for the new armed forces thoroughly. Recruits had to pass a literacy test, an aptitude test, a drug test and an HIV test, and their names and faces were put on posters which are distributed to try to make sure none have a history of war crimes or other human rights violations. A new batch of 500 screened personnel started to arrive at the Camp Ware base at VOA Careysburg, inland from Monrovia, for initial training in early November 2007, joining 608 others who had graduated earlier.

The Minister of Defense that President Ellen Johnson Sirleaf appointed in early 2006, Brownie Samukai, had a good public reputation.

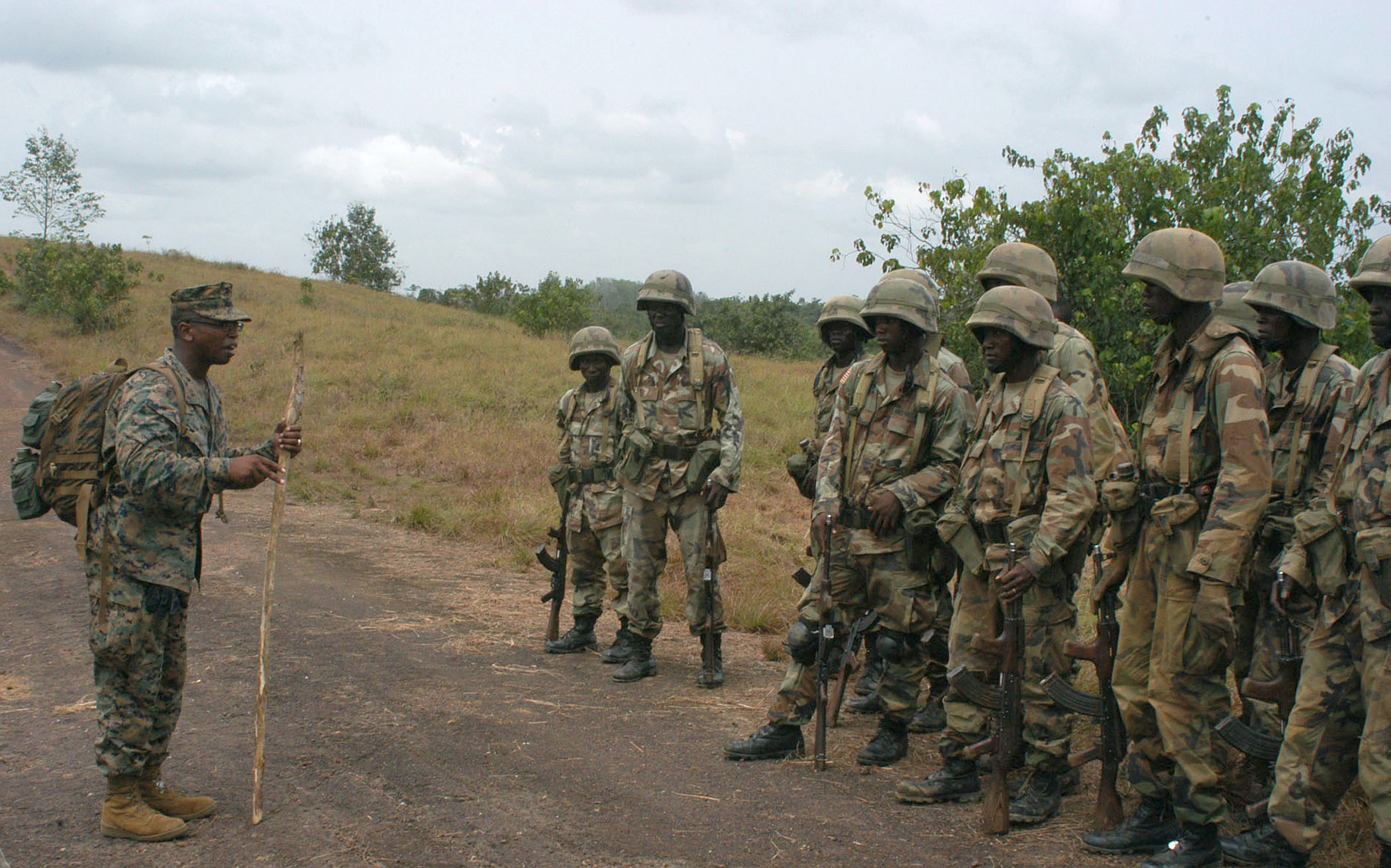
A U.S. Marine Corps officer speaks to AFL troops during a 2009 training exercise.

There appears to be some lack of coordination, at least according to The Wall Street Journal, between the Ministry of National Defense and DynCorp, who is training the new army. The newspaper said in an August 2007 report:

Mr. Samukai also complains that he feels sidelined from the formation of an army that, as defense minister, he is supposed to oversee. Neither the State Department nor DynCorp will let him see the company's contract, for instance. And the U.S. insists that instead of talking directly to DynCorp managers, he go through Major Wyatt [chief of the Office of Defense Cooperation at the U.S. Embassy in Monrovia] on all matters related to the training.

Whether well regarded or not, Samukai has been accused of misusing his power; there have been allegations that he has ordered soldiers to manhandle other senior Liberian government officials—the Comptroller General of the Ministry of Finance in August 2008.

A 2007 RAND study, “Making Liberia Safe”, proposed an integrated security concept to guide force development; it urged the Liberian government, the United States and the United Nations to coordinate detailed force plans, establish a small police quick‑reaction unit and a small Coast Guard, build court and corrections capacity, and consolidate and appropriately vet the multiple police, customs and intelligence services. "At present, nonstate external and internal threats are more likely than threats from neighboring states. The size of the AFL is less important than that it be superior in quality and capability to foreseeable threats."

On January 11, 2008, a total 485 soldiers graduated from Initial Entry Training class 08–01. The addition of this third class of soldiers, consisting of 468 men and 17 women, raised the total strength of the AFL from 639 to 1,124. As the new Liberian force developed, UNMIL started winding down its initially 15,000 strong peacekeeping mission; by 2008 the force had been reduced to 11,000.

In the interim buildup period, President Johnson-Sirleaf decided that a Nigerian officer would act as the Command Officer-In-Charge of the new armed forces. Major General Suraj Abdurrahman succeeded the previous incumbent, Lieutenant General Luka Yusuf, in early June 2007; Lieutenant General Yusuf had been posted home to Nigeria to become Chief of Army Staff.

Luka had succeeded the previous Liberian Chief of Staff, Kpenkpa Y. Konah, in 2006. In mid-July 2008, five reinstated AFL officers returned from the Nigerian Armed Forces Command and Staff College after training there. These officers include Lt Cols. Sekou S. Sheriff, Boakai B. Kamara, Aaron T. Johnson, Daniel K. Moore and Major Andrew J. Wleh. Subsequently, Aaron T. Johnson was promoted to colonel and confirmed by the Liberian Senate as Deputy Chief of Staff of the AFL, immediately subordinate to General Abdurrahman. A number of the current senior AFL officers have been drawn from the ranks of the previous 1993–94 Interim Government of National Unity paramilitary police force, the 'Black Berets.'

Facility reconstruction has not been limited to VOA/Camp Ware and Schiefflin/EBK. The Chinese Government offered in 2006 to rebuild Camp Tubman in Gbarnga, and the new facility was opened in April 2009. There is also a plan to rebuild Camp Todee in Todee District, upper Montserrado. The Barclay Training Center (BTC) was handed back to the Government of Liberia on July 31, 2009, at a ceremony attended by the Minister for National Defense and the United States Ambassador after four years of management by DynCorp.

In October 2009 a State Partnership Program relationship was begun between the AFL and the U.S. state of Michigan's Michigan National Guard. Of the other large number of security agencies, plans existed as of mid-2008 at least to dissolve the Ministry of National Security, the National Bureau of Investigation and the Liberia Drug Enforcement Agency. The 2009–2010 budget appears to indicate however that this consolidation has not taken place.

=== Peacekeeping operations ===
In 2013, the AFL deployed a platoon as part of the United Nations Multidimensional Integrated Stabilization Mission in Mali (MINUSMA), marking the first time that the AFL had operated abroad since the United Nations Operation in the Congo in the early 1960s. Initially under Nigerian command, the AFL platoon came under Togo Contingent Command when Nigeria withdrew from the mission. Despite some initial logistical problems the platoon performed admirably, performing patrols and VIP escort duties. The deployment has now seen a number of rotations:

- Platoon 1 (Capt.? Nathaniel Waka) – 45 personnel strong; June 23, 2013, to June 26, 2014
- Platoon 2 (Capt. Ernest A. Appleton) – June 26, 2014, to June 25, 2015
- Platoon 3 (Capt. Stephen T. Powo) – June 25, 2015, to September 2, 2016
- Platoon 4 (Capt. Forkpah Tarnue) – September 2, 2016, to ...

From February 2017 the Mali deployment was increased to a 75-strong contingent, growing to a company of 105 personnel, with additional military observers and staff officers, from September 2018. In August 2019 training was completed of another company, the sixth rotation, due for deployment in September 2019.

May 3, 2017, saw the first Liberian soldier killed on deployment with MINUSMA. Corporal Sheriff Ousmane was killed when a rebel group fired mortars into a UN base near Timbuktu. Seven other Liberians were wounded in the bombardment, three seriously so, together with a Swedish peacekeeper.

During January 2019 the Ministry of National Defense announced plans to send a platoon-size contingent of peacekeepers to the United Nations Mission in South Sudan (UNMISS).

== Structure ==
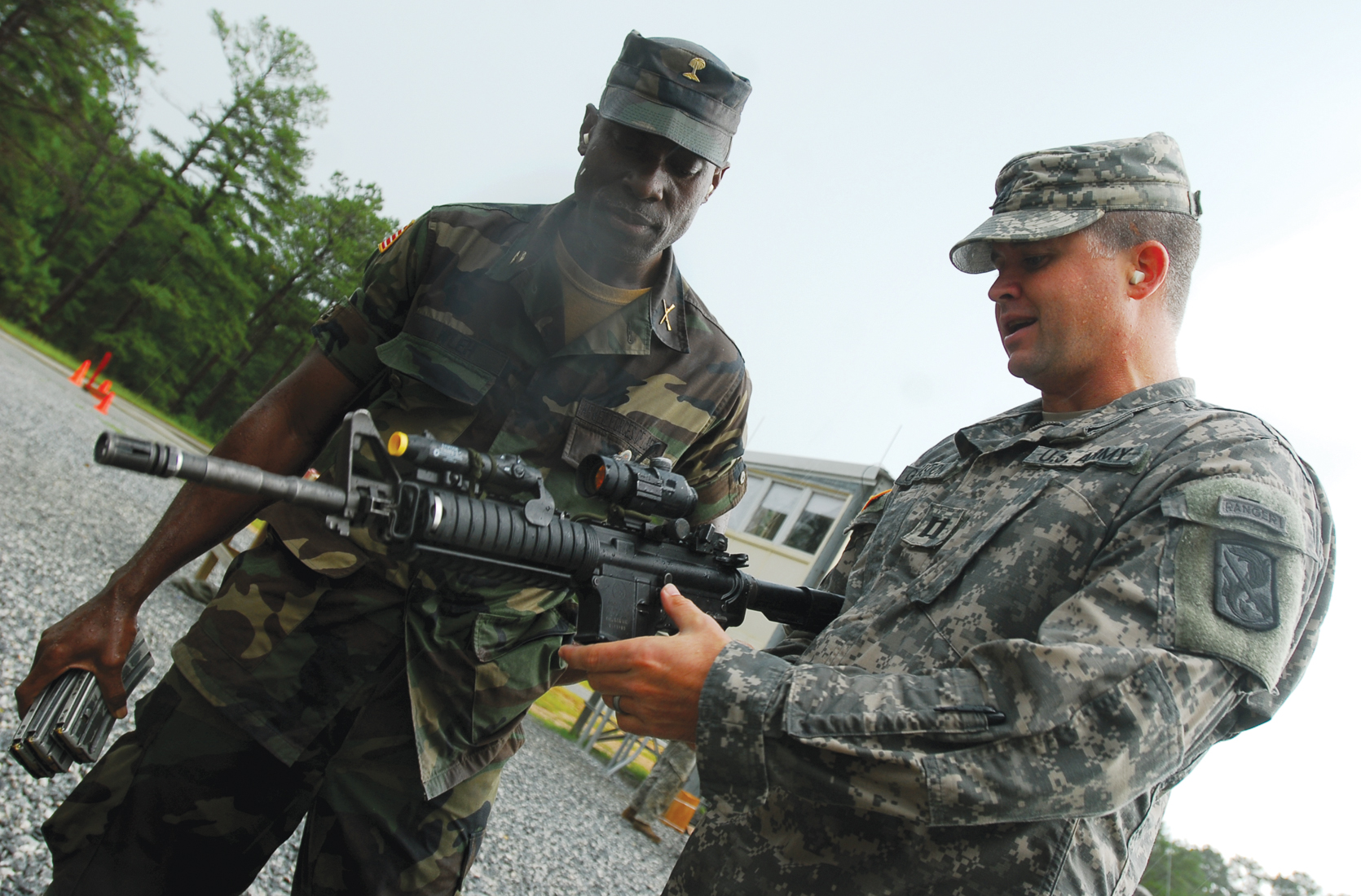
Major Andrew Wleh, commander, AFL Armed Forces Training Command (left), discusses marksmanship training with a U.S. Army officer (right) whilst on a visit to the United States.

=== 23rd Infantry Brigade ===
The Liberian ground forces currently consist of two infantry battalions under the 23rd Infantry Brigade and supporting units. The 1st Battalion, 23rd Infantry Brigade, was formed on August 29, 2008, at the Barclay Training Center in Monrovia, and the 2nd Battalion, 23rd Infantry Brigade in December that year. Both battalions are currently based at the former Camp Schiefflin, which has now been renamed the Edward Binyah Kesselly Barracks, often known simply as 'EBK Barracks.'

As a result of the concentration of troops at EBK, the camp was overcrowded, and disturbances among the soldiers have occurred. As of mid-2009, the Ministry of Defense is attempting to alleviate the problem by relocating some personnel to Camp Tubman in Gbarnga.

The two battalions and supporting units went through training and preparation for an assessment exercise, a modified US Army Readiness Training Evaluation Program (ARTEP), which was held in late 2009. When declared operational, the 23rd Infantry Brigade was planned to be commanded by a colonel with a headquarters of 113 personnel. Supporting units were to include a band platoon (40 members), engineer company (220 strong), Brigade Training Unit (162 strong, now retitled the Armed Forces Training Command, located at Camp Ware under Major Wleh), and a military police company (105 strong). The force operates according to slightly modified United States Army practices, and uses U.S. doctrine.

"..The first battalion started the United States Army Training and Evaluation Programme, which it will complete in September [2009], while the second battalion will complete the programme in December [2009]. At that time, the United States contractors currently training and equipping the force will hand over to the Ministry of National Defense, which will assume responsibility for training and standing up the new army. The United States has indicated that it plans to assign as many as 60 United States serving military personnel to continue mentoring the Armed Forces of Liberia, beginning in January 2010."

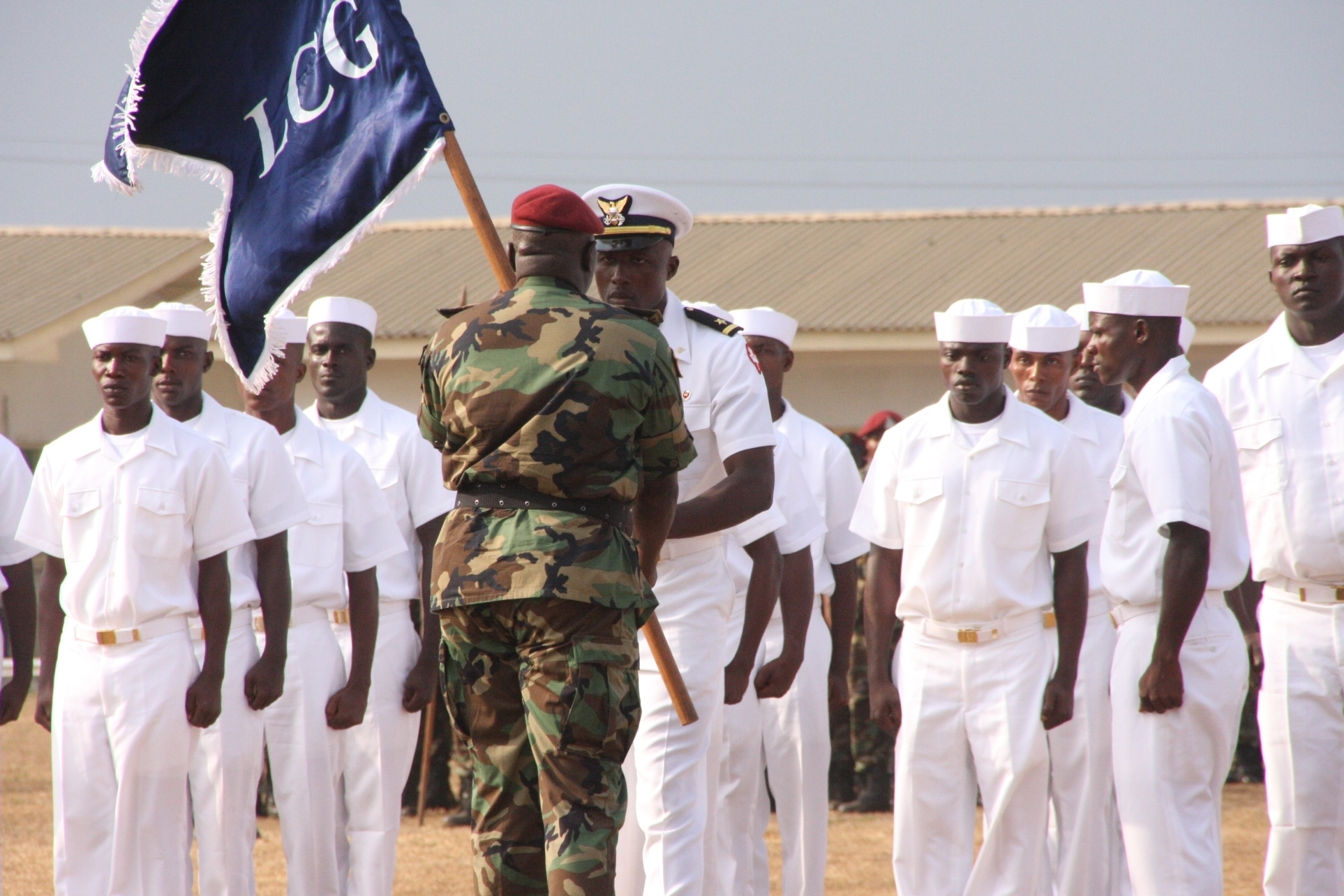
Major General Suraj Abdurrahman, Command Officer-in-Charge of the AFL, hands over a new Guidon to the reactivated Coast Guard.

As of December 2010, a Logistics Command is being established within the AFL, taking the same name as a pre-Civil War AFL formation.

=== Coast Guard ===
The Coast Guard was reactivated on the 53rd Armed Forces Day on February 11, 2010, with an initial strength of 40 personnel who had been trained in the United States. A United States Coast Guard officer is now serving at the U.S. Embassy in Monrovia supporting efforts to reestablish the Liberian Coast Guard.

A detachment from SeaBee Naval Mobile Construction Battalion 7, based at Naval Station Rota, Spain, constructed a United States Africa Command-funded boat ramp and concrete perimeter wall for the Coast Guard, which was handed over in December 2010. In February 2011, the United States turned over two donated USCG Defender class boats to the Coast Guard.

The ranks and insignia of the Armed Forces of Liberia are based on those of the United States Department of Defense, and are laid out in the Liberian Defense Act of 2008.

=== Air Force ===
Liberian Air Force Roundel

The Liberian Air Force was formally dissolved in 2005 as part of the armed forces demobilization programme, though it had effectively ceased to exist during the civil war. There was also a paramilitary Justice Air Wing operating some Mil Mi-2s. After 2003, only the United Nations Mission in Liberia (UNMIL) operated military aircraft in Liberia – Mil Mi-8 transport and Mil Mi-24 attack helicopters from Roberts International Airport with several subsidiary locations. These aircraft left the country on or before the cessation of UNMIL operations on 31 March 2018.

In 2018–19, two Liberian pilots were trained by the Nigerian Air Force, and the Chief of Staff of the AFL visited Ghana to discuss military cooperation opportunities, including those related to the reestablishment of an aviation capability.

== Equipment ==
=== Infantry battalion equipment ===
"The basic weaponry provided to the AFL- AK-47 assault rifles and RPG-7 rocket-propelled grenade launchers—[was] compatible with that of other ECOWAS countries. ..[W]eapons were donated by the Romanian government." Other reporting on weaponry includes AKM and PM md. 63 assault rifles, and PK machine guns. It may also include Streit Cougar vehicles.

=== Aircraft inventory ===
The Liberian Air Force inventory for its entire existence included:

Aircraft	Origin	Type	Variant	In service	Notes
Transport
De Havilland Canada DHC-4 Caribou	Canada	Transport		2	
Cessna 208 Caravan 1	United States	Transport		1	
Boeing 707	United States	VIP	Boeing 707-351B	1	Government transport
Boeing 727	United States	VIP	Boeing 727–25	1	Government transport
BAC 1–11	United Kingdom	VIP	BAC 1–11 Series 401AK	1	Government Transport
Communications
Cessna 150K	United States	Communications		2	Operated by the Liberian Army Air Reconnaissance Unit
Cessna 172	United States	Communications		1	Operated by the Liberian Army Air Reconnaissance Unit
Cessna 180E	United States	Communications		1	Operated by the Liberian Army Air Reconnaissance Unit
Cessna 206	United States	Communications		2	Operated by the Liberian Army Air Reconnaissance Unit
Helicopters
Mil Mi-24	Russia	Attack		1	
Mil Mi-2	Poland	Transport		1	Operated by the Justice Air Wing

== Training ==
=== Higher education ===
The Tubman Military Academy at Camp Todee in Montserrado County trains officer candidates in the AFL. The Officer Candidate School is part of the academy.

=== ROTC ===
The first Liberian Reserve Officers' Training Corps (ROTC) program was established in 1956 at the University of Liberia (UL) in Monrovia and the Booker Washington Institute (BWI) in Kakata. In August 2015, the Ministry of National Defense announced its intention with the Ministry of Education to resume ROTC in Liberian schools. ROTC had not been institutions since the end of the conflicts in the 2000s. A year later, an ROTC pilot program was established at (BWI).

=== Armed Forces Training Command (AFTC) ===
The Armed Forces Training Command (AFTC) is the training center for the Armed Forces of Liberia. It was established in February 2009.
