= Bureau of Immigration =

Bureau of Immigration may refer to:

- Bureau of Immigration (India), an Indian government agency under the Ministry of Home Affairs
- Bureau of Immigration (Philippines), a Philippine government agency
- Bureau of Immigration and Naturalization, former name of the Liberia Immigration Service
- Bureau of Immigration and Customs Enforcement, a former name of the United States Immigration and Customs Enforcement
