= Child prostitution in West Africa =

Child prostitution is prevalent in all major cities in West Africa with girls typically being the focus, as boys in the sex trade are often overlooked. Reasons for entrance into prostitution vary; they include child trafficking and forces associated with "survival sex" such as poverty, sexual abuse, and homelessness, all with resulting effects such as the spread of HIV and other STIs. The presence of underage individuals in the sex trade is perceived as taboo in many communities in West African countries; however, there are only a limited number of established policies or developed programs in some countries aiming to combat the health concerns regarding children in prostitution.

== Causes ==
=== Survival sex ===
==== Poverty ====
Determined causes of widespread child prostitution in West Africa are mostly anecdotal with poverty leading as the underlying driving factor. Children in a financial crisis turn to practicing prostitution in order to provide for their families and themselves.

On the other hand, children's entrance into prostitution in West Africa is also a result of their parents' evaluation of their family's circumstance. If a family is at a financial deficit, or looking to maintain a certain lifestyle, the heads of the household, the parents, may decide to send their children off to seek work away from home, sometimes forcefully, in order to increase their household income.

==== Family dysfunctions ====
Children with family dysfunctions are also at a higher risk for involvement in prostitution. Adolescents who face negligence or domestic abuse often times flee their homes and enter the sex trade. Many children in the sex trade have been subjected to some form of sexual abuse prior to prostitution. A child's entrance into the sex trade is often the result of a long process often beginning with sexual abuse experienced between the ages of nine and eleven. Additional situations increasing the likelihood of a child in prostitution include: foster care, domestic work, a lack of parental support, child maltreatment, forced marriage, dropping out of school, and illiteracy.

=== Sex trafficking ===
Child prostitution is the most common form of commercial sexual exploitation of children (CSEC), which also includes child trafficking for sexual purposes. With trafficking, children are forced to migrate within or across national boundaries to engage in commercial sex unwillingly. Though child prostitution is prohibited by the United Nations Optional Protocol on the Sale of Children, Child Prostitution and Child Pornography of 2000, it still remains prevalent in West African countries. Several policymakers have affirmed that child trafficking is one of the fastest growing organized crimes in the world. Its ability to survive the restraints set by laws protecting the children is attributed to the resulting profitable capital. Recruiters could earn anywhere from 50 to 1,000 dollars for delivering children to employers within Africa, with the successful delivery of an African child to the United States receiving as much as 10,000 to 20,000 dollars.

== Effects ==
=== HIV/AIDS and STDs ===
The increased spread of HIV, AIDS, and STDs is affiliated with the increased sexual exploitation of children in the sex trade. The high susceptibility of adolescents in West Africa to HIV and STDs is a result of various factors including their lack of access to condoms and their inability to negotiate the use of them, and a fear of losing clients as well as their income. Furthermore, the uncorroborated, yet widespread misconception that having sex with children protects against HIV and cures AIDS further increases the desire of buyers for children in the sex trade. Underage girls are further sexually exploited, due to preconceived notions that they are less likely to have sexual diseases and are easier to persuade to have unprotected sex.

=== Mental effects ===
Children removed from sex trafficking can be suicidal and suffer from a loss of confidence, especially if they lack a stable support system.

== Boys in prostitution ==
The presence of underage boys in prostitution is often times overlooked and not seen as an imperative issue in Western Africa. Anti-gay opinions have become the norm in Africa with some countries criminalizing homosexuality. In most African countries the extensiveness of boy prostitution is seldom admitted or expressed as an issue, due to a combination of deeply rooted gender roles set by religion and sociocultural values.

The greatest leading factor in West Africa leaving boys more prone to prostitution is homelessness. This displacement from their home is a result of an assortment of reasons including: sexual abuse, homophobia, and discrimination, all common experiences for people within this population. Many underage boys fled their home as a means to escape physically and/or sexually abusive households while others who identify as gay fled their home as a result of the homophobic atmosphere.

Boys in the sex trade engage in commercial sex predominantly as a response to homelessness. Unlike their female counterparts, boys in prostitution are rarely under the control of a pimp and instead are more actively in charge in their practice of prostitution. This false perception of control results in law enforcement and agencies focused on aiding distressed children to overlook and even disregard boys in prostitution. If arrested, boys in prostitution are less often charged with prostitution than prostituted girls, and are instead charged with other crimes. This tendency of higher authorities dismissing encounters of underage boys in prostitution reduces the chances of their getting referred to assistance. The combination of a lack of awareness from service providers regarding the nature of boys in prostitution as well as the boys' reluctance to seek aid, due to possible prosecution for homosexual relations, limits the ability of the boys to access support.

== Preventions by country ==
=== Benin ===
Several parties are involved in the formation of Benin's anti-trafficking laws aiming to protect children from child trafficking through two measures including the promotion of an overall healthy childhood as well as precautionary measures required for child relocation. These key organizations include the Justice Ministry, which has an office specifically dedicated to child protection; the Family Ministry; UNICEF Benin, whose primary activities center around child-trafficking as seen on their website; and the ILO, with their flagship project LUTRENA focused on protecting children from trafficking. Furthermore, Benin has implemented a law that regulates the movement of children and suppresses child trafficking. This law entails extensive requirements for a child's relocation within the country's borders in order to provide law enforcement agencies a means to arrest and discourage traffickers.

=== Ghana ===
Ghana's established Criminal Offenses Act 1960 provides several protections for child victims of sexual exploitation. The act states that children under the age of 12 can not legally be held accountable for their actions; however, many of the offences set to protect children only apply when a child is below the age of 16. This leaves victims of commercial sexual exploitation between the ages of 16 and 18 liable to being criminalized.

=== Liberia ===
In Liberia, the trafficking of children below the age of 18 for the purpose of prostitution can be charged with up to 20 years of imprisonment. Liberian law states that a child who is the victim of sexual exploitation cannot be criminalized. Though Liberia has enacted an anti-trafficking law, its implementation has been limited due to frequent corruption and inadequate resources.
