= Liberia National Police =

Law enforcement agency

- Abbreviation: LNP

Agency overview
- Formed: 1956
- Employees: 4,100

Jurisdictional structure
- Operations jurisdiction: LB
- Map of Liberia National Police's jurisdiction
- Area: 111,369 km2
- Population: 5,072,296
- Legal jurisdiction: Liberia
- Governing body: Ministry of Justice
- General nature: Civilian police

Operational structure
- Headquarters: Capitol Hill, Monrovia Liberia
- Police Officers: 4100
- Agency executive: Patrick Toe Sudue, Inspector General of Police
- Departments: List: •Training; •Operations; •Administration

Facilities
- Stations: 151

Website
- lnp.gov.lr

The Liberian National Police is the national police force in Liberia. The LNP's mandate is:

- To maintain public order and safety;
- To protect people and property;
- To identify and recover lost and stolen property;
- To prevent, detect and fight crime;
- To identify and arrest criminals;
- To enforce the law and testify in court.

== History ==
After the Second Liberian Civil War, rebuilding the police began in 2004. The Police component of UNMIL (UNPOL) registered 5,000 people who claimed to be members of the LNP. Some had no uniforms, and none had been paid for the past few years. They had survived mostly from extracting bribes from the public. Only the traffic division had smart uniforms and could be seen on duty, as their position made it easier to impose spurious fines on motorists.

According to Friedman (2011), UNPOL and Liberian police leaders, through the Rule of Law Implementation Committee, then "recruited and deployed an initial interim force of 400 former local police officers to work alongside UNPOL in its efforts to drive out former combatants and reclaim police stations in Monrovia. They also implemented UN Quick Impact Projects which included the reopening of police sub-stations, taking over roadblocks, and constructing new mini-stations."

The International Crisis Group wrote in 2011 that 'Over 4,000 officers have been trained, including the armed Emergency Response Unit (ERU) and the specialised Police Support Unit (PSU). 623 (15 per cent) of these officers are women. At a ratio to population of 1:850 and with 65-70 per cent deployed in Montserrado county alone, there are clearly not enough officers to cover the whole country. The ERU, set up in 2008 to combat spiralling armed robbery, is functional and appears efficient, though based on revised needs assessments, it has only 344 officers instead of the originally targeted 500. The PSU is meant to have 600 members by December.'

== Departments ==
The LNP is made up of five Departments: Administration; Operations; Training. & Manpower Development; Crime Services and Professional Standards

The Liberian Criminal Justice System site says that the Administration and Operations consist of:

- Administration Section
  - i. Personnel
  - ii. Finance
  - iii. Records and Identification
  - iv. The Public Affair Division – Board of Investigation, Band Unit, Chaplain & Court Liaison
  - v. Logistics
  - vi. Communication
  - vii. Planning & Research – Central Statistics Unit, Drafting
- Operations – Largest and the most important section
  - i. Patrol
  - ii. Criminal Investigation Division
  - iii. Criminal Intelligent Unit
  - iv. Interpol
  - v. Public Safety
  - vi. Motor Vehicle
  - vii. Emergency Response Unit
  - viii. Police Support Unit
  - ix. Women and Children Protection Unit

For policing purposes, Liberia is divided into five geographic areas. They are: 1. Region one – Montserrado, Margibi, and Grand Bassa Counties 2. Region two – Bomi, Grand Cape Mount, and Gbarpolu Counties 3. Region three – Bong, Nimba, and Lofa counties 4. Region four – Sinoe, Grand Gedeh, and River Cess Counties 5. Region five – River Gee, Maryland, Grand Kru Counties.

INTERPOL states that "With more than 4,100 police officers in 151 police stations across the country, the Liberian National Police (LNP) has responsibility for Liberian internal security and criminal investigations." The Liberian National Police have 844 officers spread across 33 stations in Montserrado County, which contains the capital Monrovia, as of October 2007.

== Training ==
The National Police Training Academy (LNPTA) is in Montserrado County in Paynesville City. It is headed by a Commander with three deputy commanders:

- 1. Administration
- 2. Training and Research
- 3. Curriculum Development

The Training Academy trains all members of the Liberia National Police in various phrases of law enforcement and crime prevention and investigation. It is also responsible to train members of the other law enforcement agencies such as Special Security Service, Bureau of Immigration and Naturalization, National Fire Service, Drugs Enforcement Agency, etc.

Despite a national goal to raise police strength to 8,000, the impact of earlier delays in recruitment and the suspension of training during the West African Ebola virus epidemic make it unlikely that it will go much higher than 5000 men and women by mid 2016.

== Leadership ==
In September 2016, Police Director Chris Massaquoi was succeeded by Gregory Coleman. Also appointed was Abraham Kromah, as deputy. Both had new titles in accordance with the National Police Act currently before the House, as Inspector General and Deputy Inspector General.

Kromah's appointment drew particular comment. Kromah was a nephew and an aide of Alhaji Kromah, leader of ULIMO-K, and was associated with ULIMO during the First Liberian Civil War. He said that in 1990 he was an active member of the Student Unification Party on the University of Liberia campus. During the interim rule of the Council of State in 1996, he was appointed as Chief of Staff of the Armed Forces of Liberia. He was appointed as deputy director of the LNP, with responsibility for operations, by Ellen Johnson-Sirleaf, but in May 2015 he was dismissed, along with two other senior LNP officers, without a public reason being given. He had had a serious rift with commercial motorcyclists while in the position.

== See also ==
- Crime in Liberia
- Liberia Drug Enforcement Agency
