= Crime in Liberia =

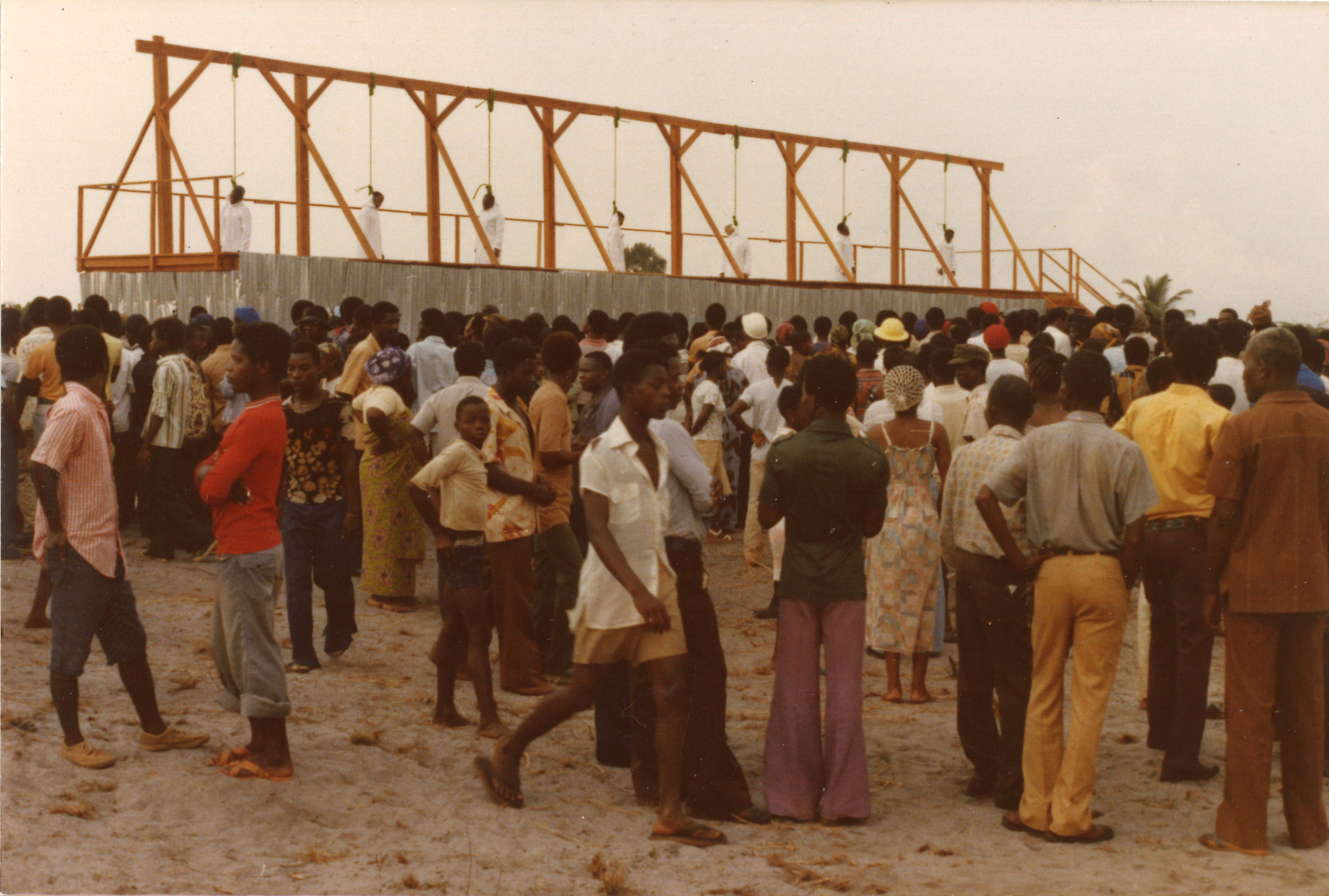
Perpetrators being hanged in the aftermath of the Maryland ritual killings.

Crime in Liberia is investigated by the Liberian police.

== Crime by type ==
=== Murder ===
According to the country's official criminal justice statistics, Liberia had a murder rate of 3.23 per 100,000 population in 2012. Because of a lack of reliable, long-term official data, the WHO used a regression model to compute an estimated homicide rate for 2012 of 11.2 per 100,000, with a 95% confidence interval between 2.6 and 48.8.

=== Corruption ===
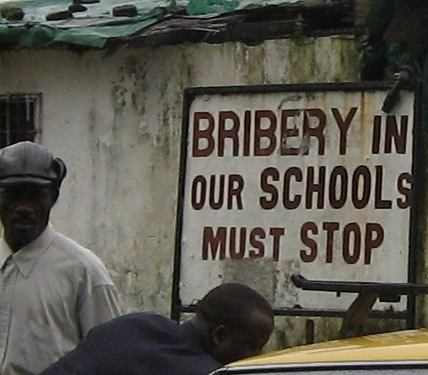
An anti-corruption sign in Liberia, 2004.

In Liberia's education system, patronage and bribery by administrators, professors, and students are widely reported. Abuse of resources, teacher absenteeism, and sex for grades are common. A culture of silence prevents reporting of problems and hence any constructive reform.

In 2013, Human Rights Watch released a report specifically about police corruption in Liberia. They interviewed more than 120 people who had said they had been victimized in their dealings with the police. They said that "police officers typically ask crime victims to pay to register their cases, for transport to the crime scene, and for pens and other items used in the investigation. Criminal suspects routinely pay bribes for release from police detention."

Street vendors said they were often the victim of police raids, especially in Monrovia. Vendors said that police routinely steal goods, arrest vendors, and then require them to pay for their release from detention. Motorcycle and taxi drivers throughout the country described harassment and extortion along roads. Those who refuse to meet officers’ demands face violence and arrest. Elite armed units, such as the Police Support Unit, were frequently cited for violent abuses.

=== Human trafficking ===
Liberia is a source, transit, and destination country for children trafficked for forced labor and sexual exploitation. Most victims are trafficked within Liberia, primarily from rural areas to urban areas for domestic servitude, forced street vending, and sexual exploitation. Children are also trafficked to alluvial diamond mining areas for forced labor.

=== Sexual violence ===
Rape and sexual assault are frequent in the post-conflict era in Liberia. Liberia has one of the highest incidences of sexual violence against women in the world. Rape is the most frequently reported crime, accounting for more than one-third of sexual violence cases. Adolescent girls are the most frequently assaulted, and almost 40% of perpetrators are adult men known to victims. The sexual scandal involving Katie Meyler’s More Than Me Foundation (MTMF) in Liberia was a major international incident that led to the collapse of the highly-regarded organization.
