= Tubman Military Academy =

Training center

The Tubman Military Academy was a training center for officers of the Armed Forces of Liberia. It formed at the same time a branch of the present in Monrovia University of Liberia and made cadet the Liberian armed forces and civilian students who were to receive an academic and military training.

The school was named after Reverend Arthur Tubman, he was the father of the president William Tubman and also General of the Liberian army.

== Location ==
The training center is located about 45 km north of the capital Monrovia near the village of Igenta and about one kilometer from the Saint Paul River away. Nearby is also the Mount Coffee Hydropower Project.

== History ==
The Liberian Frontier Force were during the Second World War allies of the United States. The necessary conditions for modern military training and equipment were set in 1940 at a meeting of the US admirals' LeBreton with the Liberian Secretary Clarence Simpson aboard the cruiser USS Omaha off the coast of Monrovia.

Up to this point, the basic training of soldiers was completed the so-called Barclay Training Center in the Congo Town district of Monrovia. These were initially only a spartan furnished tent camp on the outskirts of the capital. With few exceptions, the Liberian military was spared from active participation in hostilities in Europe. The reinforcement of the Liberian army was taken on by President William Tubman in the early 1960s as the European colonial empires in Africa broke apart and there were fears in neighboring countries of colonial wars and civil war-like conditions. The Armed Forces of Liberia (AFL) were formed from the Frontier Force in 1962. To form the required officers at the end of the 1960s, Arthur Tubman Military Academy was founded as a branch of the University. Besides the U.S. in the 1960s also Israel sent military trainers to Liberia.

Erected in a wooded area, the building complex was attacked and partially destroyed during the Civil War.
