= Petty officer third class =

Military rank

A petty officer third class is a non-commissioned officer in some navies and coast guards.

== By country ==
=== United States ===
Petty officer third class
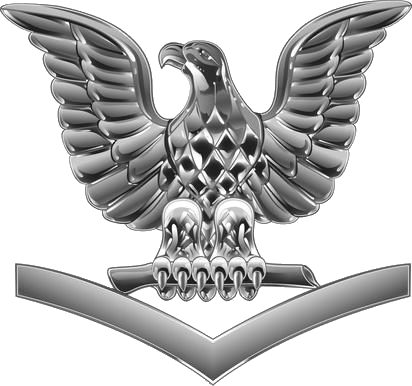
- Navy and coast guard collar device

- Navy and coast guard sleeve insignia
- Country: United States
- Service branch: United States Navy; United States Coast Guard
- Abbreviation: PO3
- Rank group: Non-commissioned officer
- NATO rank code: OR-4
- Pay grade: E-4
- Next higher rank: Petty officer second class
- Next lower rank: Seaman
- Equivalent ranks: Corporal (Army or USMC); Senior airman (Air Force); Specialist 4 (Space Force)

Petty officer third class is the fourth enlisted rank in the U.S. Navy and the U.S. Coast Guard, above seaman and below petty officer second class, and is the lowest rank of non-commissioned officer, equivalent to a corporal in the U.S. Army and Marine Corps. Petty officer third class shares the same pay grade as senior airman in the Air Force, which no longer has an NCO rank corresponding with E-4. Specialists in the Army are not recognized as NCOs either, even though they are also in the E-4 pay grade.

==== History ====
Unlike seaman and lower ranks, a sailor's advancement to petty officer third class is not automatic given time in service, but is also contingent on performance evaluations by their superiors and rate examinations (tests of specialty knowledge), except for certain technical ratings which carry automatic advancement to PO3 after successful completion of that rating's class "A" school and fulfillment of time in rate requirements. The advancement cycle is currently every six months. Only a certain number of billets (job openings for a given rate) open up biannually and all seamen compete for promotion. The top scorers are chosen for advancement, but only in sufficient numbers to fill the billets available.

Petty officers serve a dual role as both technical experts and as leaders. Unlike the sailors who rate below them, there is no such thing as an undesignated petty officer. Every petty officer has both a rate and rating (job, similar to an MOS or AFSC in other branches). The pay grade and rating combined are known collectively as a sailor's rate. A petty officer's full title is a combination of the two. Thus, a petty officer third class who has the rating of Aviation Structural Mechanic is called an Aviation Structural Mechanic Third Class. The term petty officer is only used in abstract, the general sense, when referring to a group of petty officers of different ratings, or when the petty officer's rating is unknown.

Each rating has an official abbreviation, such as AM for aviation structural mechanic. When combined with the petty officer level, this gives the shorthand for the petty officer's rate, such as AM3 for aviation structural mechanic third class. It is common practice to refer to the petty officer by this shorthand in all but the most formal correspondence, such as printing an inscription on awards. Often the petty officer is referred to by the shorthand designation, without using the surname. Thus AM3 Anderson would be called AM3. To address a petty officer, one would say, "Petty Officer Smith", "Smith", or "sailor", the latter two forms being acceptable for use by those equal or greater in rate than the petty officer. It is uncommon to address a petty officer as simply "petty officer" the way one might address an NCO in the Army as "sergeant". It is also acceptable, though archaic, to address a petty officer or chief petty officer of any grade as "Mister Smith" or "Miss Smith". In the modern navy, however, the use of "miss" or "mister" is common only in reference to junior commissioned officers or warrant officers.

The rank insignia for a petty officer third class is a white perched eagle and one specialty mark (rating) above a chevron. On dress uniforms the symbol for the petty officer's rating is placed between the two. On the dress white uniform, the eagle, rating, and chevron are navy blue. This has led to the eagle, and even the entire rating badge, being commonly referred to as "the crow." On the dress blue uniform, the eagle and rating are white, and the chevron is red. The insignia worn on working uniforms, such as coveralls and the naval working uniform, and metal rate devices, like those worn on the collar of the naval service uniform, have the rating symbol omitted.

When a sailor is advanced to petty officer third class, it is traditional for sailors already holding that or a higher enlisted rank to "tack on the crow." Originally this custom involved a recently advanced sailor's fellow petty officers taking turns stitching the new rank insignia on the sailor's uniform, the rushed needlework referred to as "tacking." More recently the custom has taken on a different form, being done with a gesture ranging from a light tap to a hard punch over the new petty officer's sleeve insignia. This, however, has lately been deemed "hazing," and as such individuals involved in this practice can be subject to disciplinary action. This disciplinary action often includes the individual being demoted. The "tacking on of the crow" has also been known to cause serious injury. It is not just patches that are "tacked on," but also metal insignia in the chest area that have sharp attachment pins, such as the insignia for surface warfare or submarine service. A hard enough punch can cause the attachment points to pierce a sailor's skin. Commanding officers are also known to direct the ship corpsman to perform physical exams for possible abuse and to report all injuries to newly promoted personnel, so punishment cannot be avoided.

==== High year tenure ====
The U.S. Navy's high year tenure policy has made the good conduct variation for a petty officer third class all but obsolete. Among enlisted sailors 12 consecutive years of good conduct (categorized as no court-martial convictions or non-judicial punishments) entitles the sailor to wear a good conduct variation of their rank insignia, with the normally red chevrons under the specialty mark and perched eagle worn as gold and the eagle itself worn as silver. However, the high year tenure initiative mandates that a petty officer third class may only have ten years of service. If a PO3 fails to make petty officer second class within those ten years, the petty officer is involuntarily separated for not meeting advancement requirements. This same restriction has been imposed upon the rates of petty officer second class and first class, allowing 16 years of service to a PO2 before advancement must be attained, and 22 years of service to a petty officer first class. All of these initiatives, however, may be waived in the event the sailor holds critical training qualifications, Navy Enlisted Classification (NEC) job codes, or special clearances. Today the few instances in which a PO3 has gold chevrons are usually instances in which a sailor has previous military service. The single gold chevron is extremely rare, but can still be found in Navy uniform shops.

All U.S. Coast Guard petty officers wear red chevrons and red service stripes until the rate of chief petty officer, who wear gold chevrons and service stripes.

== Gallery ==
ፒቲ ኦፊሰር 3ኛ ክላስ
Pītī ofīseri sositenya kilasi
(Ethiopian Navy)

(Liberian National Coast Guard)

(United States Navy)

(United States Coast Guard)

== See also ==
- Petty officer
- List of comparative military ranks
