= Seaman apprentice =

Enlisted rate

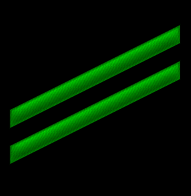
- Navy Seaman insignia and Airman variation

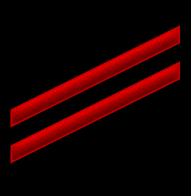
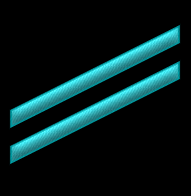
- Navy Fireman and Constructionman variation

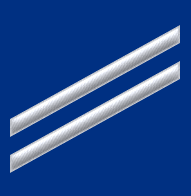
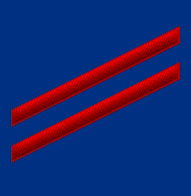
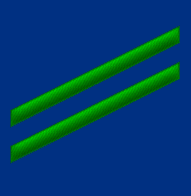
- USCG Seaman, Fireman and Airman Apprentice
- Country: United States
- Service branch: United States Navy; United States Coast Guard
- Abbreviation: SA
- Rank group: Enlisted rank
- NATO rank code: OR-2
- Pay grade: E-2
- Next higher rank: Seaman
- Next lower rank: Seaman recruit
- Equivalent ranks: Private Army; Private first class USMC; Airman USAF; Specialist 2 USSF

Related articles
- History: Seaman second class

Seaman apprentice is the second lowest enlisted rate in the U.S. Navy, U.S. Coast Guard, and the U.S. Naval Sea Cadet Corps just above seaman recruit and below seaman; this rank was formerly known as seaman second class.

The current rank of seaman apprentice should not be confused with the rank of apprentice seaman which was the lowest Navy rank from 1904 to 1948. In the old system apprentice seaman was followed by seaman 2nd class and seaman 1st class. (The three tiered rank system for seamen dates from the 18th Century Royal Navy when the ranks were called landsman, ordinary seaman and able seaman.)

The actual title for an E-2 in the U.S. Navy varies based on the community to which the sailor belongs. Likewise, the color of their group rate marks also depends on their community.

- Those in the general deck and administrative community are seamen apprentice (SA). They wear white stripes on navy blue uniforms, and navy blue (black) stripes on white uniforms.
- Hospital corpsmen are hospital apprentice (HA). They are the only rate in this community. They wear white stripes on navy blue uniforms, and navy blue stripes on white uniforms.
- Those in the engineering and hull community are called fireman apprentice (FA) and wear red stripes on both navy blue and white uniforms.
- Those in the aviation community are called airman apprentice (AA) and wear green stripes on both navy blue and white uniforms.
- Seabees are called construction apprentice (CA) and wear light blue stripes on both navy blue and white uniforms.

No stripes are worn on the working uniforms - coveralls or utilities.

In October 2005, the dental technician rating was merged with the hospital corpsman rating, eliminating the dentalman apprentice title. Those who once held the rank of dentalman apprentice have instead become hospital apprentices.

Sailors who have completed the requirements to be assigned a rating and have been accepted by the Bureau of Naval Personnel as holding that rating (a process called "striking") are called designated strikers, and are called by their full rate and rating in formal communications (i.e., "machinist's mate fireman apprentice", as opposed to simply "fireman apprentice"), though the rating is often left off in informal communication. Those who have not officially been assigned to a rating are officially referred to as "undesignated" or "non-rates."

== See also ==
- U.S. Navy enlisted rate insignia
- Comparative military ranks
