= Liberian National Coast Guard =

Naval force in Liberia

- Founded: 1959
- Country: Liberia
- Type: Coast guard
- Anniversaries: February 11
- Engagements: First Liberian Civil War; Second Liberian Civil War

Commanders
- Commander-in-Chief: President Joseph Boakai
- Minister of National Defense: Geraldine George
- Commander of the Coast Guard: Captain (LCG) Daniel ZB Holman Jr.

Insignia
- Naval Jack

- Ensign

The Liberian National Coast Guard is the naval force of Liberia, part of the Armed Forces of Liberia. Its main duties are law enforcement along Liberia's coast and in its maritime area, and aiding those in distress.

== History ==
Members of the Liberian National Coast Guard at the inauguration of President William R. Tolbert in 1976

Liberia acquired a small number of naval ships during its early history. In 1892 the steel gunboat Gorronomah, built in Ireland, became its first ship, and in 1894 it acquired the gunboat Rocktown, built in the Netherlands. They were both out of service by 1900. In 1916 the auxiliary schooner President Howard was acquired from Germany and was the only ship in the Liberian Navy, but it was sunk in April 1918 by the German submarine U-154.

The Liberian National Coast Guard, was established in 1959. Throughout the Tubman period the coastguard was little more than a few sometimes unserviceable patrol craft crewed by ill-trained personnel, though its training improved in the 1980s to the point where it was considered the best trained of the armed services.

In 1984 the Liberian National Coast Guard contained about 450 personnel. Under Samuel Doe the Coast Guard was retitled the Liberian Navy in 1986 through the passage of The Liberian Navy Act of 1986. However, as a result of the First and Second Liberian civil wars, the navy lost control of its bases and was reduced to an insignificant force.

The Coast Guard was reactivated on the 53rd Armed Forces Day on February 11, 2010, with an initial strength of 40 personnel who had been trained in the United States. A United States Coast Guard officer is now serving at the U.S. Embassy in Monrovia supporting efforts to reestablish the Liberian Coast Guard.

A detachment from SeaBee Naval Mobile Construction Battalion 7, based at Naval Station Rota, Spain, constructed a United States Africa Command-funded boat ramp and concrete perimeter wall for the Coast Guard, which was handed over in December 2010. In February 2011, the United States turned over two donated USCG Defender class boats to the Coast Guard.

== Fleet ==
The fleet of the Liberian National Coast Guard currently consists of:

- 2x 27' Defenders (SAFE 27 Full Cabin)
- 2x 33' Law Enforcement (SPC-LE) - based on Defender-class (SAFE 33 Full Cabin)
- 2x 24' Boston Whalers

== Ranks ==
The ranks and insignia of the Liberian National Coast Guard are based on those of the United States Coast Guard, and are laid out in the Liberian Defense Act of 2008.

=== Officers ===
Rank group	General/flag officers	Senior officers			Junior officers
Liberian National Coast Guard
Liberian National Coast Guard		Captain	Commander	Lieutenant commander	Lieutenant	Lieutenant (junior grade)	Ensign

=== Enlisted personnel ===
Rank group	Senior NCOs					Junior NCOs		Enlisted
Liberian National Coast Guard
Liberian National Coast Guard	Master chief petty officer	Senior chief petty officer	Chief petty officer	Petty officer first class	Petty officer second class	Petty officer third class	Seaman	Seaman recruit
