= Petty officer second class =

Rank found in some navies and maritime organizations

Petty officer second class (PO2) is a rank found in some navies and maritime organizations.

== Canada ==
Petty officer, 2nd class, (PO 2), is a Naval non-commissioned member rank of the Canadian Armed Forces. It is senior to the rank of master sailor (formerly master seaman) and its equivalents, and junior to petty officer 1st-class and its equivalents. Its Army and Air Force equivalent is sergeant (Sgt); together, Sgts and PO 2s make up the cadre of senior non-commissioned officers.

The rank insignia of the PO 2 is three gold chevrons, point down, surmounted by a gold maple leaf. A PO 2 is generally initially addressed as “Petty Officer <name>” or "PO <name>", and thereafter as "PO", although in correspondence the full rank or abbreviation is used before the member's name. The full appellation Petty Officer 2nd Class or PO 2 in speech is generally used only when the second-class distinction must be made, such as to distinguish between members with similar names but differing ranks, or on promotion parades. The corresponding NATO rank is OR-6—however, a PO 2 with less than 3 years seniority are considered OR-5

PO 2s generally mess and billet with chief petty officers and other petty officers, and their army and air-force equivalents, warrant officers and sergeant. Their mess on naval bases or installations is generally named the "Chiefs and POs Mess".

== United States ==
Petty officer second class
- USN PO2 insignia: 12 or more years (left) or less than 12 years (right) of service (A 12-consecutive-year period of good conduct is no longer a prerequisite for authorization to wear gold chevrons.)

- USCG PO2 insignia

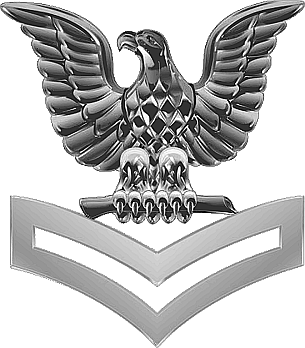
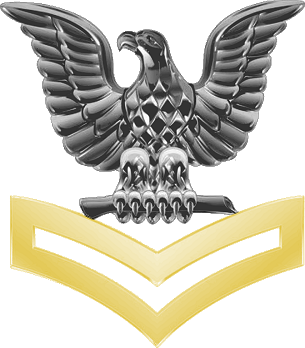
- Cap and collar insignia US Navy PO2 and USCG PO2
- Country: United States
- Service branch: United States Navy; United States Coast Guard
- Abbreviation: PO2
- Rank group: Non-commissioned officer
- Rank: Petty officer
- NATO rank code: OR-5
- Pay grade: E-5
- Next higher rank: Petty officer first class
- Next lower rank: Petty officer third class
- Equivalent ranks: Sergeant (USA, USMC, USSF); Staff sergeant (USAF)

Petty officer second class is the fifth enlisted rank in the U.S. Navy (E-5) and the U.S. Coast Guard, just above petty officer third class and below petty officer first class, and is a non-commissioned officer. It is equivalent to the rank of sergeant in the Army and Marine Corps, and staff sergeant in the Air Force. It is the most commonly held rank in the United States Navy, with around 25% of active-duty Navy enlisted personnel and 20% of all active duty Navy personnel (including commissioned officers) holding that rank.

=== Overview ===
Promotion to petty officer second class is dependent on time in service, performance evaluations by superiors, and rate (technical specialty) examinations. Advancement to E-5 in the Navy is through a program known as the Billet Based Advancement System. Eligible E-4 sailors compete for a billet with the highest ranked sailors getting promoted first.

=== Job description ===
Petty Officers serve a dual role as both technical experts and as leaders. Unlike the sailors below them, there is no such thing as an "undesignated Petty Officer." Every Petty Officer has both a rate (rank) and rating (job, similar to an MOS in other branches). A Petty Officer's full title is a combination of the two. Thus, a Petty Officer Second Class, who has the rating of interior communications electrician would properly be called an Interior Communications Electrician, Second Class (IC2).

=== Rate abbreviations ===
Each rating has an official abbreviation, such as GM for gunner's mate, BU for builder, or BM for boatswain's mate. When combined with the petty officer level, this gives the shorthand for the petty officer's rate, such as IT2 for "information systems technician second class". It is common practice to refer to the petty officer by this shorthand in all but the most formal correspondence (such as printing and inscription on awards). Unlike most rates, the Aircrew survival equipmentman rate uses their former title of parachute rigger for abbreviation and are still referred as PRs and parachute riggers in the military community after undergoing a rating name change in 1986.

=== Insignia color ===
In the U.S. Coast Guard, all petty officers at a rank below chief petty officer wear red chevrons and red service stripes, whereas chief petty officers wear both gold chevrons and gold service stripes. In the U.S. Navy, under regulations in effect since 2019, all petty officers wear red stripes and red chevrons until they reach 12 consecutive years of service, at which time they begin wearing gold stripes regardless of their specific rank or of any disciplinary history; before the 2019 change in regulations, gold stripes indicated 12 or more uninterrupted years of good conduct in service.

== Gallery ==
Petty officer second class
(Belize Coast Guard)

Petty officer 2nd class
(French: Maître de 2^{e} classe)
(Royal Canadian Navy)

ፒቲ ኦፊሰር 2ኛ ክላስ
Pītī ofīseri huletenya kilasi
(Ethiopian Navy)

Petty officer second class
(Ghana Navy)

Petty officer second class
(Liberian National Coast Guard)

Petty officer second class
(United States Navy)

Petty officer second class
(United States Coast Guard)

== See also ==
- Petty officer
- U.S. Navy enlisted rate insignia
- Comparative military ranks
- Navy Rank/Rate Abbreviations
