= Seaman recruit =

Low-ranking person in some navies and coast guards

Seaman recruit is the lowest rate used in the U.S. Navy and U.S. Coast Guard. It is the equivalent of able rate in the Royal Navy, or seaman/sailor in other NATO navies.

== United States ==
Seaman recruit
- U.S. Coast Guard insignia

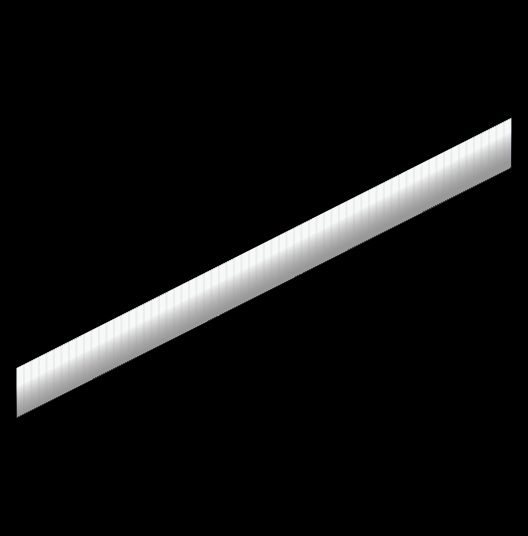
- U.S. Navy insignia (obsolete since 1996)
- Country: United States
- Service branch: Navy; Coast Guard; Naval Sea Cadet Corps
- Abbreviation: SR
- Rank group: Enlisted rate
- NATO rank code: OR-1
- Pay grade: E-1
- Next higher rank: Seaman apprentice ((Navy or USCG)
- Equivalent ranks: Private (USA); Private (USMC); Airman basic (Air Force); Specialist 1 (USSF)

Seaman recruit (SR) is the lowest enlisted rate in the United States Navy, U.S. Coast Guard, and the U.S. Naval Sea Cadet Corps, just below seaman apprentice; this rank was formerly known as seaman third class. Two separate pay grades exist within this rank (and the corresponding ranks in the other branches of the United States military structure) — one for those with service of less than four months, and a higher pay scale for those in service for more than four months, even if they have not yet advanced to seaman apprentice.

=== History ===
Navy seaman recruits do not bear any uniform rank insignia currently. Prior to 1996, a diagonal stripe—the same as the U.S. Coast Guard—was used.

While all E-1s in the Coast Guard are called seaman recruits regardless of their assignment, the actual title for an E-1 in the U.S. Navy varies based on the community to which the sailor belongs:

- Navy E-1s in the general deck and administrative community are seaman recruits (SR).
- Navy E-1 hospital corpsmen are hospital recruits (HR). This is the only rating in this community.
- Fireman recruits (FR) are Navy E-1s in the engineering and hull community.
- Navy E-1s in the aviation community are called airman recruits (AR).
- Navy Seabees are called construction recruits (CR).

In October 2005, the dental technician rating was merged with the hospital corpsman rating, eliminating the dentalman recruit title. E-1s who held the rank of dentalman recruit at the transition became hospital recruits.

Sailors who have completed the requirements to be assigned a rating and have been accepted by the Bureau of Naval Personnel as holding that rating (a process called "striking") are called designated strikers and are called by their full rate and rating in formal communications (e.g., "machinist's mate fireman recruit", as opposed to simply "fireman recruit"), though the rating is often left off in informal communication. Those who have not officially been assigned to a rating are officially referred to as "undesignated" or "non-rates".

== See also ==
- United States Navy enlisted rates
- Comparative military ranks
- Landsman
