= Liberia Drug Enforcement Agency =

The Liberia Drug Enforcement Agency (LDEA) is an agency established within the Liberian government on December 23, 1998, charged with fighting drug-related crimes. The LDEA is supervised by the Ministry of Justice and is charged with fighting drug trafficking at the country's borders, arresting traffickers and dealers, and destroying illegal drugs. The LDEA is not responsible for overseeing commerce in legal drugs and other pharmaceuticals; such substances are within the purview of the Pharmaceutical Board of Liberia.

== History ==
Before its creation, fighting drug crimes was a responsibility of the Ministry of Defense. The agency began as the National Drug Committee of the Interim Government of National Unity; it was created in 1993 during the presidency of Amos Sawyer. Five years later, the committee was converted into its present form: President Charles Taylor signed a bill passed by the National Legislature that created the LDEA and patterned it after the Drug Enforcement Administration in the United States.

In 2011, the LDEA boss was Director Henry Shaw, but by 2012 he had been replaced by Anthony Souh. According to LDEA boss Anthony Souh, the agency suffers from substantial internal corruption. Directors are appointed by the President subject to confirmation by the Senate of Liberia.

== See also ==
- Opioid addiction in Liberia
