= Petty officer first class =

Rank found in some navies and maritime organizations

Petty officer first class (PO1) is a rank found in some navies and maritime organizations.

== Canada ==
Petty officer, 1st class, PO1, is a Naval non-commissioned member rank of the Canadian Forces. It is senior to the rank of petty officer 2nd-class and its equivalents, and junior to chief petty officer 2nd-class and its equivalents. Its Army and Air Force equivalent is warrant officer (WO).

The French form of the rank is maître de 1re classe.

The rank insignia of the PO1 is a crown worn on both forearms of the Service Dress tunic, and on slip-ons on both shoulders of other uniforms. PO1s are generally initially addressed as "Petty Officer Bloggins" or "PO Bloggins", and thereafter as "PO", although in correspondence the full rank or abbreviation is used before the member's name. The full appellation "Petty Officer 1st-Class" or "PO1" in speech is generally used only when the "first-class" distinction be made, such as to distinguish between members with similar names but differing ranks, or on promotion parades.

== United States ==
Petty officer first class
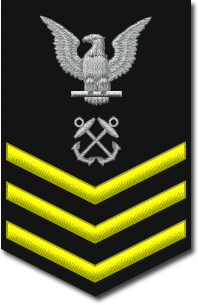
- USN PO1 insignia left 12 or more years/right less than 12 years (12 years of consecutive good conduct is no longer required to wear gold chevrons)

- USCG PO1 insignia

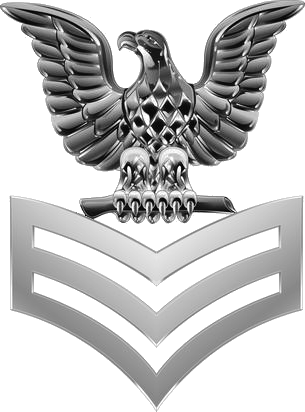
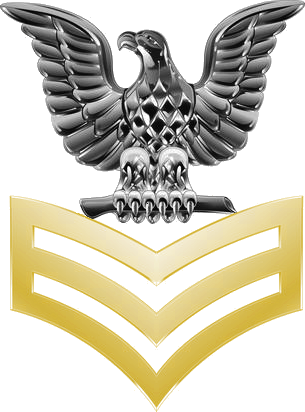
- Cap and collar insignia US Navy PO1 (under 12 years), US Navy PO1 (12 or more years) and USCG PO1
- Country: United States
- Service branch: United States Navy; United States Coast Guard
- Abbreviation: PO1
- Rank group: Non-commissioned officer
- Rank: Petty officer
- NATO rank code: OR-6
- Pay grade: E-6
- Next higher rank: Chief petty officer
- Next lower rank: Petty officer second class
- Equivalent ranks: Staff sergeant (USA, USMC); Technical sergeant (USAF, USSF)

It is the sixth enlisted rate or enlisted rank (E-6) in the United States Navy and the U.S. Coast Guard, ranking just above petty officer second class and directly below chief petty officer. It is designated as non-commissioned officer, as are all petty officer ratings. It is equivalent to the rank of staff sergeant in the Army and Marine Corps, and technical sergeant in the Air Force.

=== Job description ===
Petty Officers serve a dual role as both technical experts and as leaders. Unlike the sailors below them, there is no such thing as an "undesignated Petty Officer." Every Petty Officer has both a rate (rank) and rating (job, similar to an MOS in other branches). A Petty Officer's full title is a combination of the two. Thus, a Petty Officer First Class, who has the rating of interior communications electrician would properly be called an Interior Communications Electrician, First Class (IC1).

=== Leading Petty Officers ===
First class petty officers normally serve as leading petty officers of a division, and direct the activities of a division. There are situations when there are more than one first class petty officers in a division, due to the demands for highly experienced or skilled sailors in technical areas. Promotion to E-6 generally comes from Navywide advancement exam or through the Command Advance to Position program. In the CAP program commanding officers have the option to promote eligible sailors into vacant E-6 billets.

The rate insignia for a petty officer, first class is a perched eagle above three chevrons. On more formal uniforms (dress white and dress blue uniform), the symbol for the petty officer's rating will be placed between the eagle and the chevrons. On white uniforms, the eagle, rating, and chevrons are dark blue (almost black- this has led to the eagle being referred to as the "crow" in common practice, and often the entire rating badge is simply referred to as the crow). On navy blue (black) uniforms, the eagle and rating are white, and the chevrons are red, unless the sailor has served in the Navy for at least 12 consecutive years, then that sailor wears gold chevrons on the dress blue uniform. In 2019 the Navy eliminated the old policy of requiring "good conduct" in order to switch to gold chevrons. Gold chevrons are also worn on the collars of the Navy blue coveralls uniform, and on the black garrison cap (only) worn with the Navy service working uniform (often called "peanut butters" or "black and tans"). The Coast Guard does not use golden chevrons until the rank of E-7. Working uniforms (all variations of the camouflage uniform) and metal rank devices do not have the rating badge symbol.

== Insignia ==
Belize Coast Guard

Maître de 1^{re} classe
Royal Canadian Navy

Ghana Navy

Liberian National Coast Guard

United States Navy

United States Coast Guard

== See also ==
- Petty officer
- U.S. Navy enlisted rate insignia
- Comparative military ranks
