= Liberia Immigration Service =

Liberian Government Agency

The Bureau of Immigration and Naturalization is an agency of the Liberian government.

It was created in 1955 via legislation that tasked it with enforcing the Aliens and National Law. The bureau has 2,081 immigration officers, including officers deployed at 48 official border crossings points (numbers may be circa 2014). To increase the number of officers to 3000, it developed a Manpower Strategic Development Plan through which some 1000 Liberian men and women qualified to join it of which 234 have already graduated from basic recruit training (data may be circa 2014).

The agency's mandate, until 2018 supported by United Nations Police advisors specially trained on border issues, includes:

- Enforce Alien and National Laws of Liberia;
- Assessment of travel documents and facilities;
- Admission and departure of travelers at sea, air, and land ports;
- Management of people admitted through regulation of status;
- Effective Border Management and control.

In 2013, Deputy Justice Minister Freddie Taylor, Deputy Bureau of Immigration and Naturalization Commissioner Robert Buddy, former solicitor general Micah Wright, and BIN Border Patrol Chief Wilson Garpeh were dismissed for alleged involvement in human trafficking.

The United Nations Mission in Liberia ceased operations in early 2018 and UNMIL advisors were withdrawn.
