= Liberia–United Kingdom relations =

- Liberia: United Kingdom

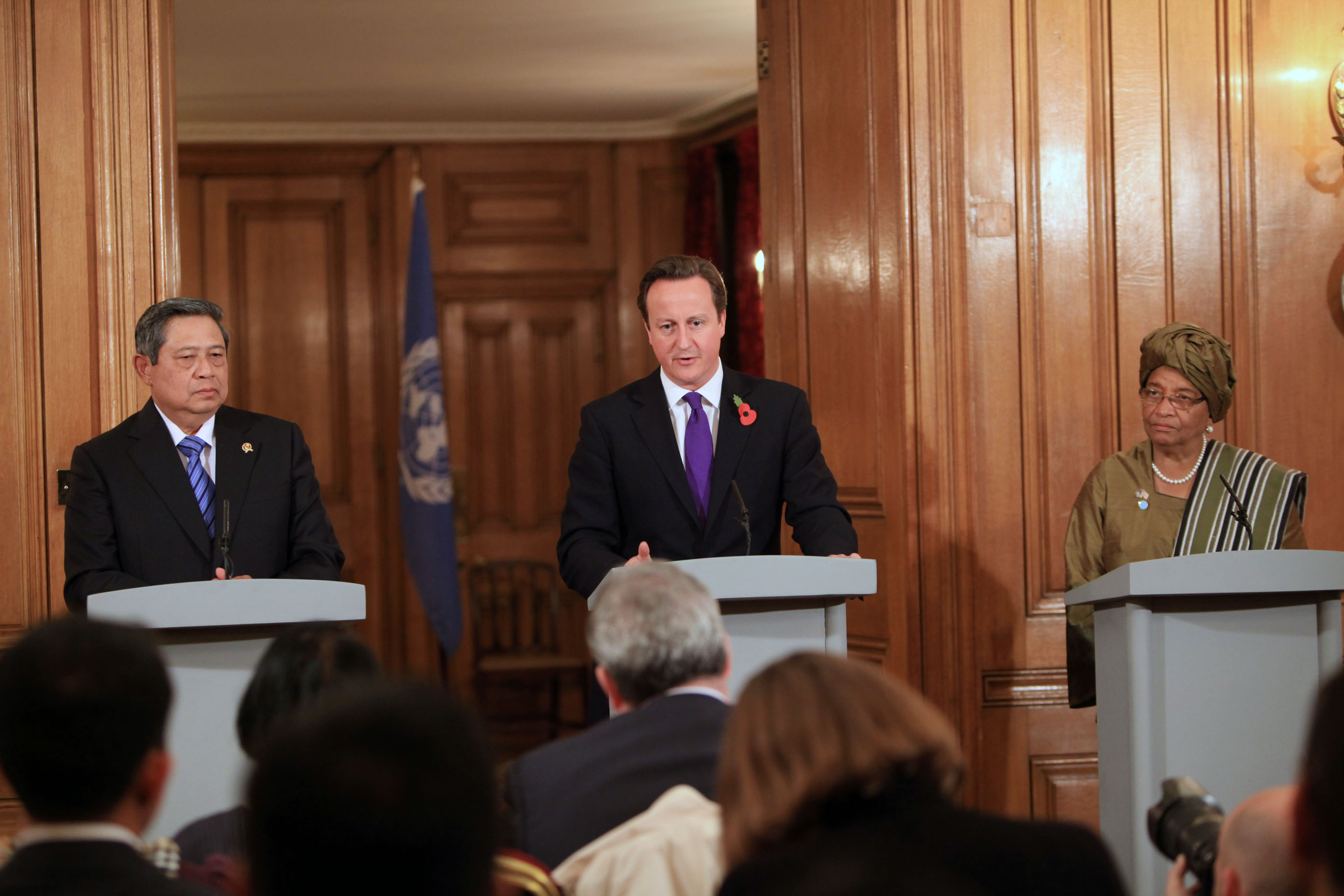
British Prime Minister David Cameron with Liberian President Ellen Johnson Sirleaf in London, November 2012.

Liberia–United Kingdom relations include the diplomatic, historical, economic, political, and foreign relations between the Republic of Liberia and the United Kingdom of Great Britain and Northern Ireland. The United Kingdom was the first country to recognise the independence of Liberia in 1848.

Both countries share common membership of the Atlantic Co-operation Pact, the International Criminal Court, the United Nations, and the World Trade Organization. Bilaterally the two countries have a Development Partnership. and a Tax Information Exchange Agreement.

== History ==
After Liberia gained independence in 1847, the United Kingdom became the first country to acknowledge its sovereignty in 1848. During much of his first term, President Joseph Jenkins Roberts spent time traveling Europe and the Caribbean, making state visits to gain recognition for his newly independent nation. During Roberts' 1848 visit to England, Queen Victoria received President Roberts and his wife, on board one of the Queen's Royal ships, and they were greeted with a seventeen-gun salute. The United Kingdom gifted Liberia two British schooners for their navy.

=== Territorial disputes ===
In the decades following independence, Liberia and the United Kingdom developed more antagonistic relations, both financially in the form of loan conditions as well as territoriality between the Republic of Liberia and the Colony of Sierra Leone. Border disputes between the two countries began in the 1860s, under President Stephen Allen Benson. In particular, Liberia claimed the territory of the Vai people along the border, although never exercised control there. Under the administration of President Edward James Roye, border disputes continued, with President Roye making two trips to London to discuss the matters with Foreign Affairs Minister Granville Leveson-Gower, 2nd Earl Granville regarding the competing claims over the disputed land.

In 1882, British Governor of Sierra Leone Arthur Havelock arrived in Monrovia with the backing of British warships. He demanded from the Liberian government the cessation of all claims to territory west of the Mano River, with the threat of bombardment. While President Anthony W. Gardner agreed with Havelock's terms, the Liberian Senate would not ratify the proposed treaty. In 1885, the United Kingdom seized the western territory. In 1887, President Hilary R. W. Johnson signed a final treaty with the United Kingdom accepting the annexation, and the Senate ratified the treaty.

In 1903, the border between the Colony of Sierra Leone and Liberia was adjusted by agreement. Further adjusting of the border happened in the Anglo-Liberian convention of 21 January 1911, in which the northern and southern borders were readjusted to have greater congruence with natural features as well as tribal divisions. Adjustments continued with agreements made in 1917 and 1930.

=== Economic entanglement ===
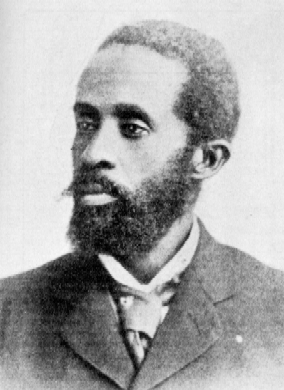
Under President Arthur Barclay, two major loans were negotiated.

Economic problems involving a lack of funds for developing and industrializing Liberia's agricultural economy and its interior became pressing during the Roye administration. This is what caused President Roye to send two representatives of the Liberian government to negotiate a £100,000 loan with a British bank operated by British Consul-General in Liberia, David Chinery. The loan was successfully negotiated, however, it ultimately hurt the Liberian economy due to the loan's uneven terms, such as large deductions limiting the amount of money the Liberian government actually received. The loan is credited as a key factor for the 1871 coup d'état which overthrew President Roye.

In 1906, under President Arthur Barclay, Liberia took out another British loan to combat national debt resulting from the 1871 loan. The £100,000 loan was negotiated through Sir Harry Johnston, author of an influential book about Liberia and chairman of the Liberian Development Company, a British firm with interest in Liberian rubber. The Liberian government gave the Liberian Development Company a large amount of power to negotiate the loan, and ultimately granted the company a wide-ranging monopoly over various natural resources of Liberia, public infrastructure development, and allowed for the establishment of a police force to defend the company's holdings, in the pursuit of Liberian development. The loan's conditions also put two British Receiver Generals in charge of Liberian customs revenue and gave the British control of the Liberian Frontier Force, which was in the process of being created. The Liberian Development Company was not controlled by Liberia, and had no obligations to the country. Little infrastructure or economic development was made by the company before Liberia severed ties with it.

Yet another major loan was negotiated in 1911, under President Arthur Barclay, and ratified in 1912, under President Daniel E. Howard. In addition to the United Kingdom, the loan involved several other countries, including the United States, France, and Germany. The loan borrowed $1,700,000, with the conditions including that the four countries would be able to each appoint General Receivers of Customs, which limited the powers of the Liberian Secretary of the Treasury. The 1912 loan was paid off in 1926, with a loan from the Finance Corporation of America.

At the onset of World War II, Liberia's economic ties with the United Kingdom threatened its neutrality early in the conflict. The United Kingdom wanted to get rid of German economic influence in Liberia, though by the early 1940s, Germany did not have much influence over Liberia. The United Kingdom ordered the Bank of Monrovia to stop handling German accounts.

=== Involvement in military ===
The Liberian Frontier Force (LFF) was made a legal reality in 1907. Under the conditions of the 1906 loan, the LFF was to be led by the British. In 1908, the LFF was modelled after the West African Frontier Force. Many of the initial soldiers of the LFF were Sierra Leonean British subjects, with personal allegiances to the British officer of the LFF, Major R. MacKay Cadell. Cadell saw himself as being under the command of the British Receiver Generals in charge of customs revenue, rather than the Liberian government. Cadell held a number of civil offices while still a part of the LFF, including chief of police, as which he replaced many Liberian policemen with Sierra Leonean soldiers. In 1909, Major Cadell attempted a coup against the Liberian government, with the pretext of his soldiers not being paid. After the Liberian government deployed militiamen to prevent Cabell's coup, Cabell surrendered. In 1912, the Liberian government pursued military men from the United States to lead the LFF, instead of those from the United Kingdom.

== Recent relations ==
In 2006, former Liberian President Charles Taylor, was set to be tried by an international tribunal for war crimes in the Sierra Leone Civil War. The United Kingdom agreed that if he were convicted, Taylor could be imprisoned in Britain. The request had been made by the Secretary-General of the United Nations, to facilitate the holding of the trial. After Taylor's conviction in 2012, he was imprisoned in HM Prison Frankland.

The most recent state visit from the United Kingdom to Liberia was on 23 November 1961, in which Queen Elizabeth II visited President William Tubman. The most recent state visit from Liberia to the United Kingdom was from 10 to 13 July 1962. President Tubman and his wife, Antoinette Tubman, visited Queen Elizabeth II. Simon Tooth is the current British chargé d'affaires to Liberia and Genevieve A. Kennedy is the current Liberian ambassador to the United Kingdom.

== Diplomatic missions ==
- Liberia maintains an embassy in London.
- The United Kingdom is accredited to Liberia through its embassy in Monrovia.

== See also ==
- Embassy of Liberia, London
- Foreign relations of Liberia
- Foreign relations of the United Kingdom
- Liberia–Sierra Leone relations
