= List of diplomatic missions of Liberia =

This is a list of diplomatic missions of Liberia, excluding honorary consulates.

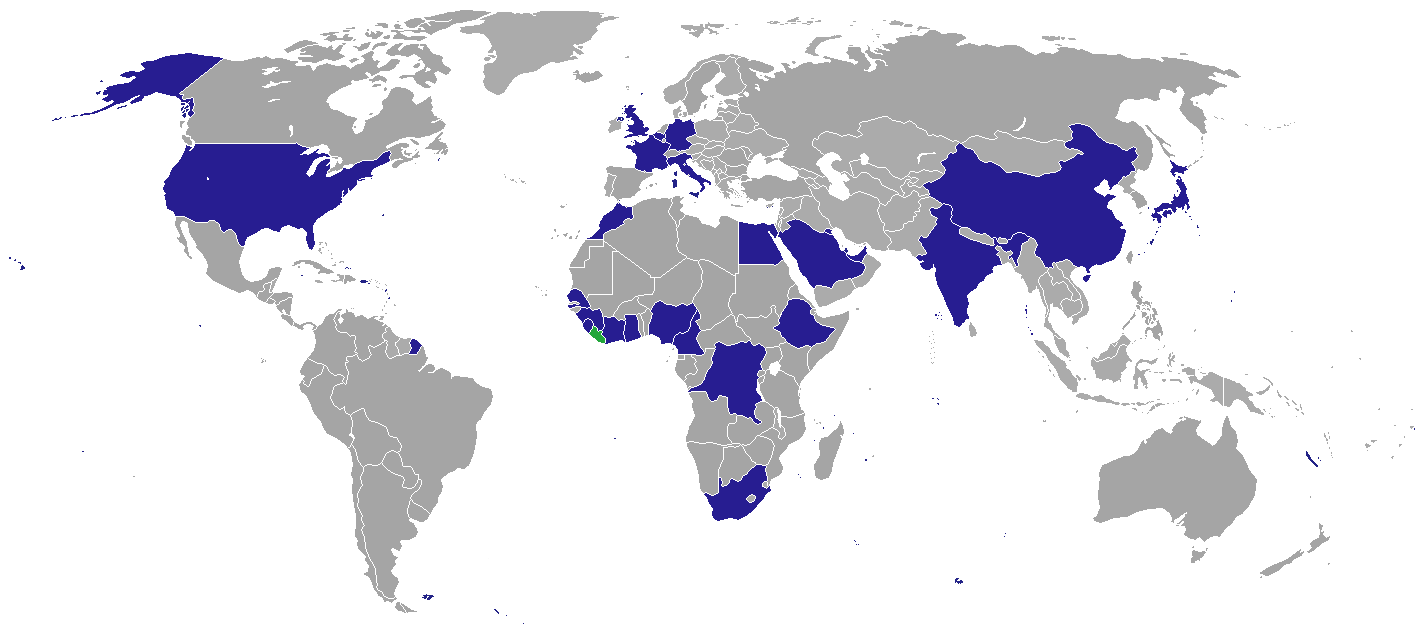
Location of diplomatic missions of Liberia: Republic of Liberia Embassy

== Africa ==
Host country	Host city	Mission	Concurrent accreditation	Ref.
Cameroon	Yaoundé	Embassy		
Congo-Kinshasa	Kinshasa	Embassy		
Egypt	Cairo	Embassy		
Ethiopia	Addis Ababa	Embassy	Countries: Kenya; Multilateral Organizations: African Union	
Ghana	Accra	Embassy	Countries: Togo	
Guinea	Conakry	Embassy		
Ivory Coast	Abidjan	Embassy	Countries: Burkina Faso	
Morocco	Rabat	Embassy		
Nigeria	Abuja	Embassy	Countries: Benin; Equatorial Guinea; International Organizations: Economic Community of West African States	
Senegal	Dakar	Embassy	Countries: Cape Verde; Gambia; Mauritania	
Sierra Leone	Freetown	Embassy		
South Africa	Pretoria	Embassy	Countries: Angola; Botswana; Eswatini; Lesotho; Malawi; Mozambique; Namibia; Zambia; Zimbabwe	

== Americas ==
Host country	Host city	Mission	Concurrent accreditation	Ref.
United States	Washington, D.C.	Embassy	Countries: Canada; Mexico; Trinidad and Tobago	
United States	New York City	Consulate-General	Countries: Canada; Mexico; Trinidad and Tobago	

== Asia ==
Host country	Host city	Mission	Concurrent accreditation	Ref.
China	Beijing	Embassy	Countries: Cambodia; Laos; Malaysia; Vietnam	
India	New Delhi	Embassy		
Japan	Tokyo	Embassy	Countries: Indonesia; New Zealand; Philippines; Singapore; South Korea; Thailand	
Kuwait	Kuwait City	Embassy		
Qatar	Doha	Embassy		
Saudi Arabia	Riyadh	Embassy		
United Arab Emirates	Abu Dhabi	Embassy		
United Arab Emirates	Dubai	Consulate-General		

== Europe ==
Host country	Host city	Mission	Concurrent accreditation	Ref.
Belgium	Brussels	Embassy	Countries: Luxembourg; Netherlands; Serbia; Multilateral Organizations: European Union; Organisation for the Prohibition of Chemical Weapons	
France	Paris	Embassy	Countries: Bulgaria; Cyprus; Greece; Monaco; Portugal; Spain; Switzerland; Multilateral Organizations: UNESCO	
Germany	Berlin	Embassy	Countries: Austria; Denmark; Finland; Norway; Sweden; Multilateral Organizations: United Nations	
Italy	Rome	Embassy		
United Kingdom	London	Embassy	Countries: Holy See; Malta; Ireland; Sovereign Entity: Sovereign Military Order of Malta	

== Multilateral organizations ==
United Nations	Geneva	Switzerland	Permanent Mission	Multilateral Organizations: Conference on Disarmament; International Labour Organization; World Health Organization; World Trade Organization
United Nations	New York City	United States	Permanent Mission	

== Gallery ==
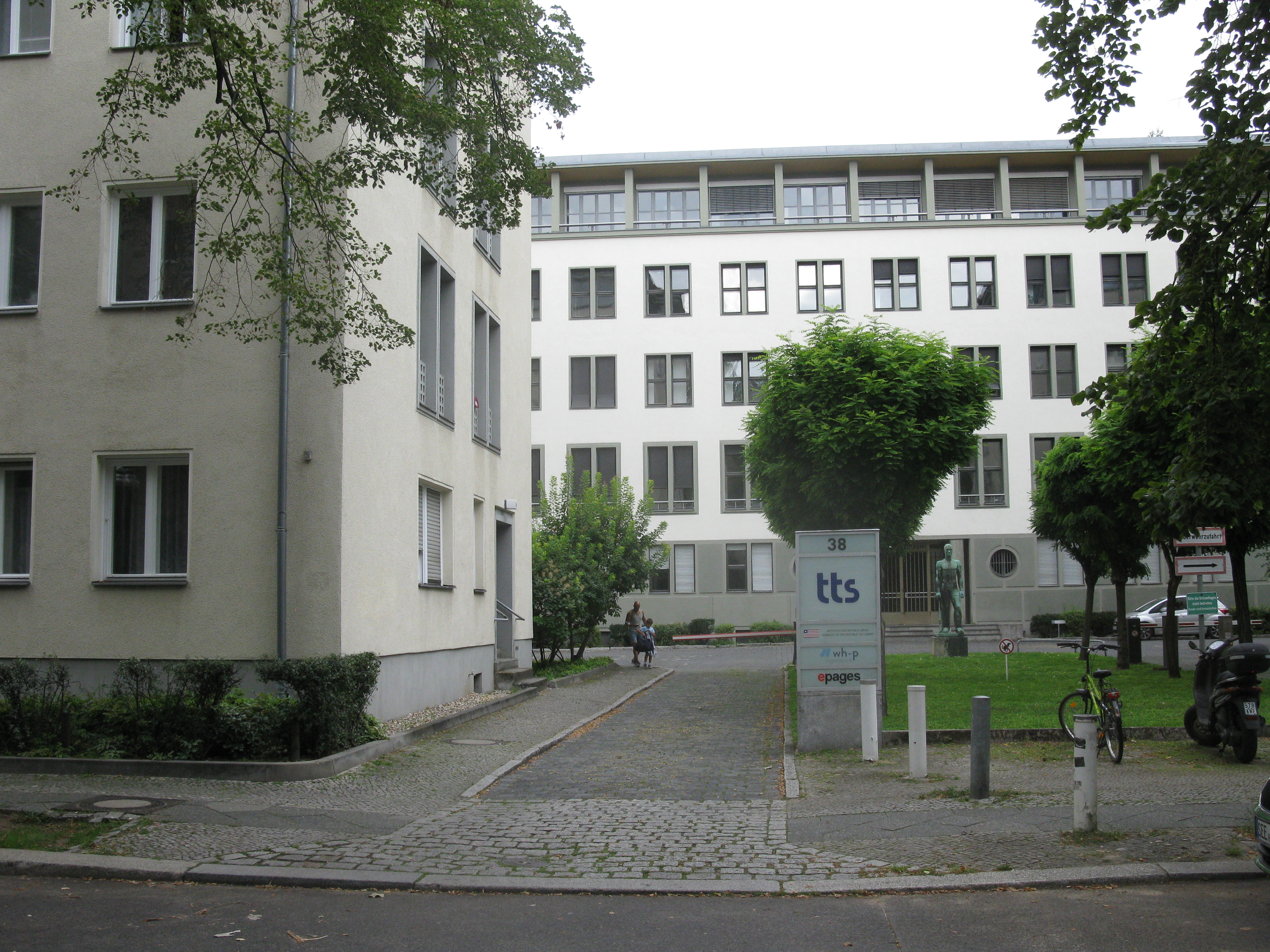
Building hosting the Embassy in Berlin

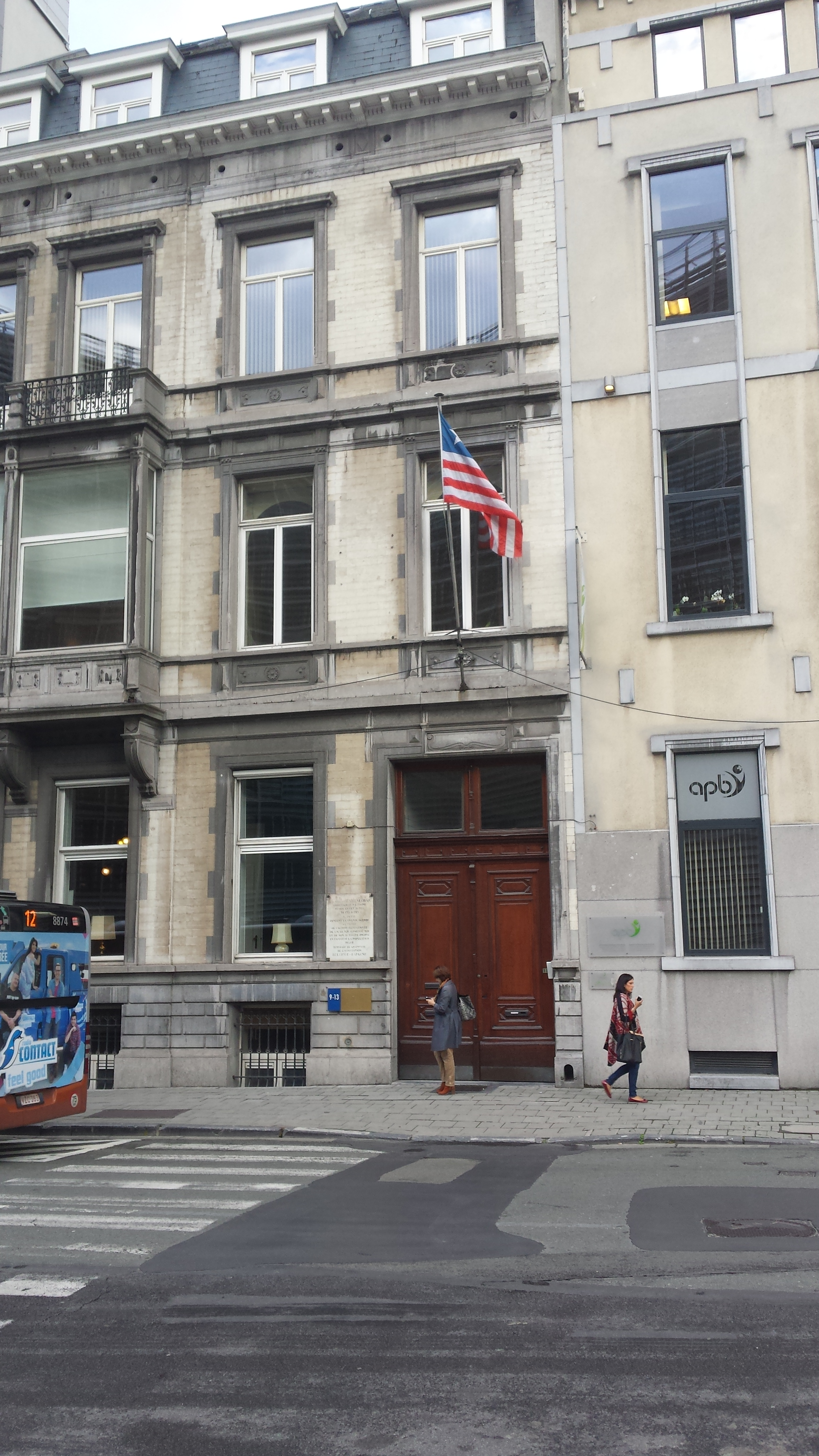
Embassy in Brussels

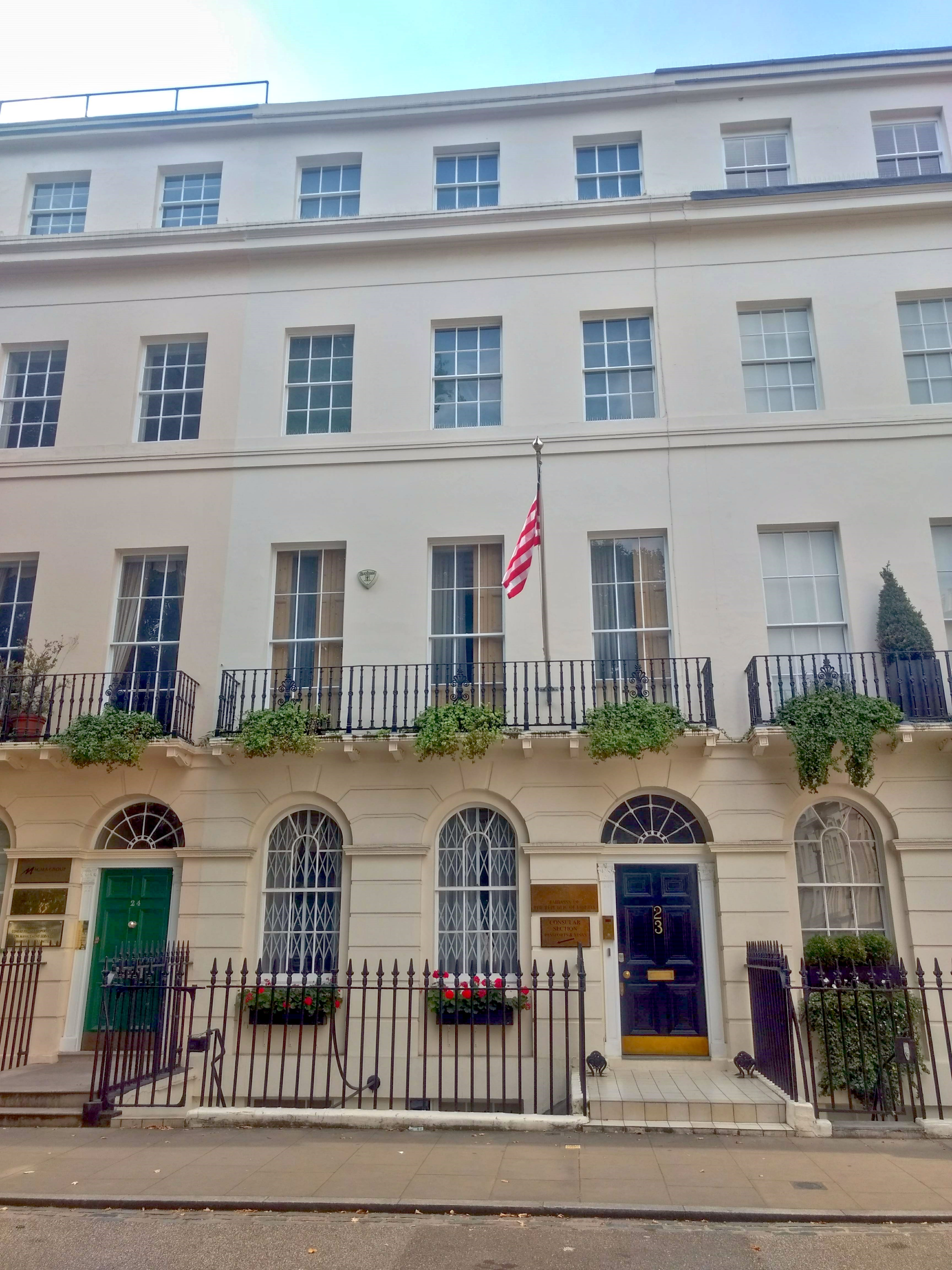
Embassy in London

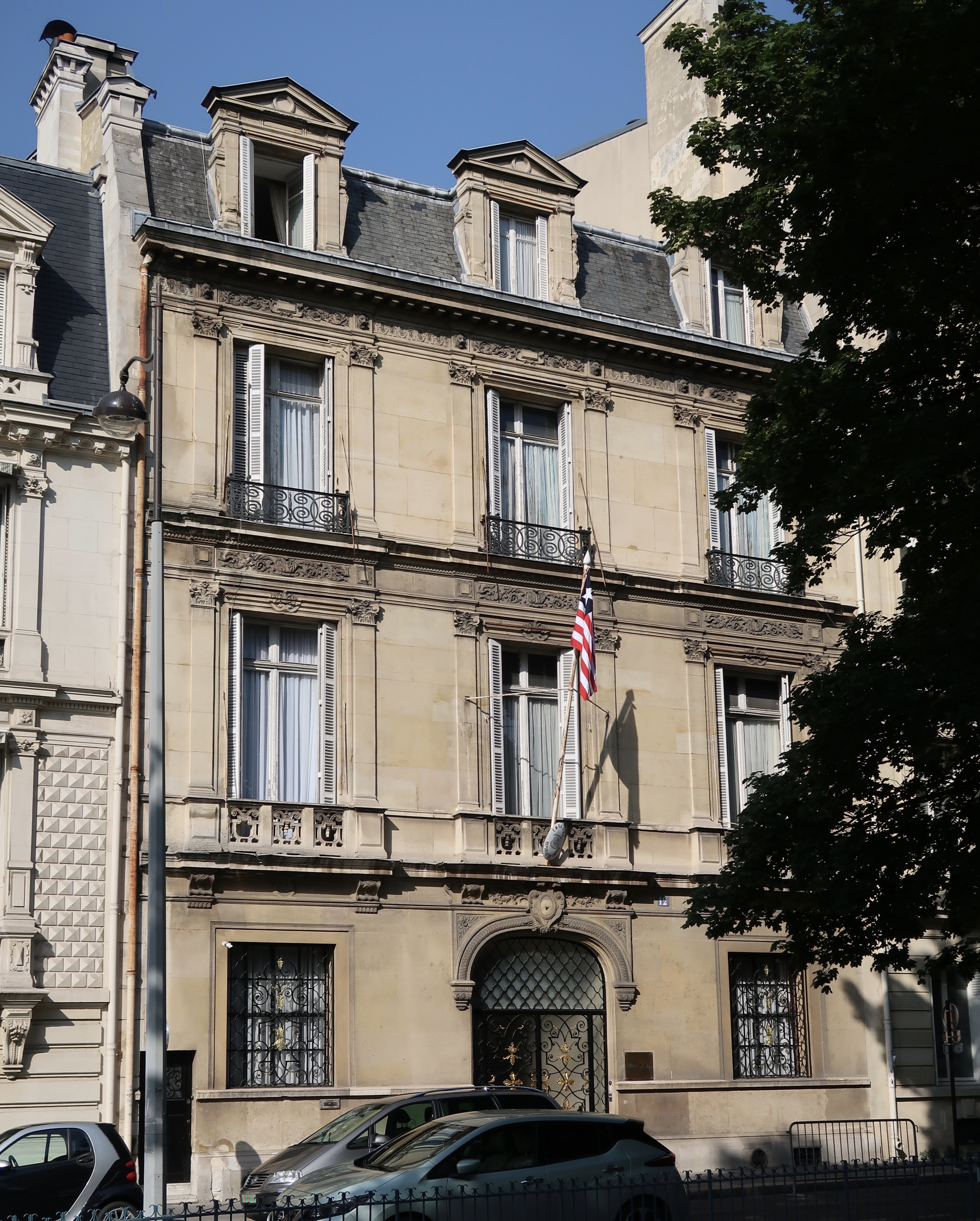
Embassy in Paris

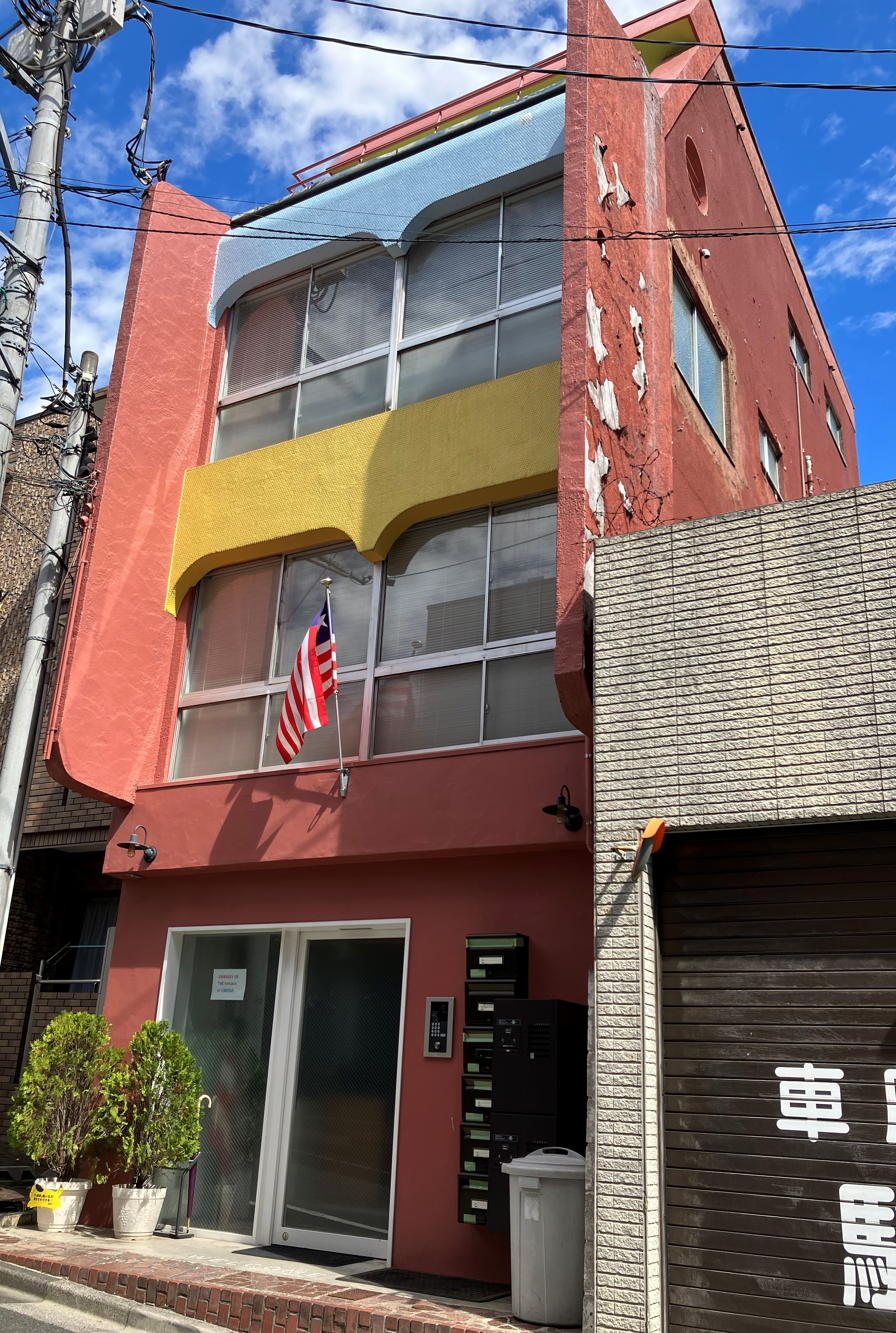
Embassy in Tokyo

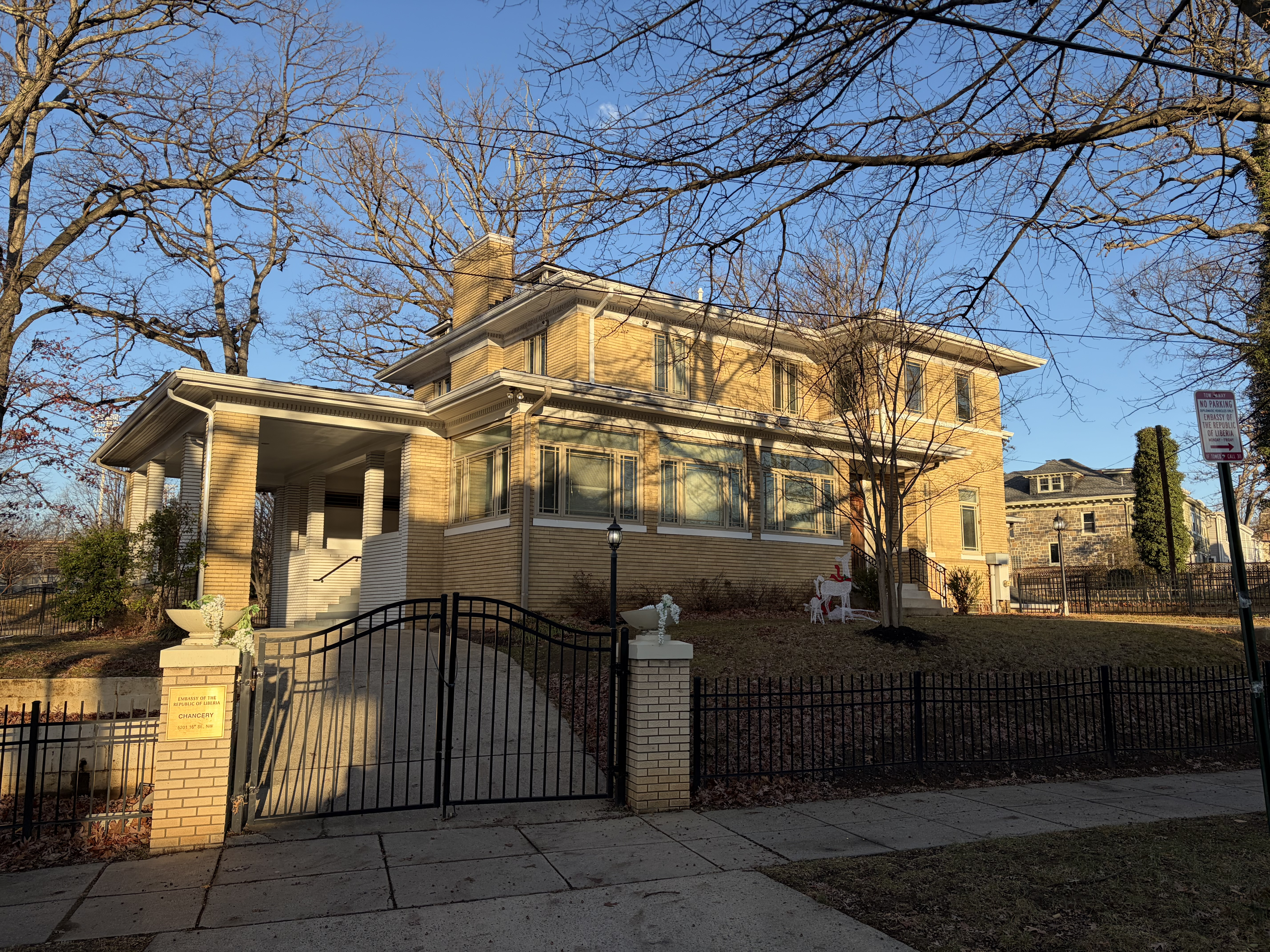
Embassy in Washington, D.C.

== Missions to open ==
- Israel
  - Jerusalem (Embassy)
- Kenya
  - Nairobi (Embassy)

== See also ==
- Foreign relations of Liberia
- List of diplomatic missions in Liberia
- Visa policy of Liberia
- Visa requirements for Liberian citizens
