= Foreign relations of Liberia =

Liberian foreign relations were traditionally stable and cordial throughout much of the 19th and 20th centuries, with a significant relationship with the United States, sharing close relations until the 1970s.

Stabilization in the 21st century brought a return to cordial relations with neighboring countries and much of the Western world. Liberia holds diplomatic relations with many western nations, including its long time partner the United States, as well as Russia, Cuba, and the People's Republic of China.

== Diplomatic relations ==
List of countries with which Liberia maintains diplomatic relations:

| # | Country | Date |
|---|---|---|
| 1 | United Kingdom | 1 August 1849 |
| 2 | France | 20 April 1852 |
| 3 | United States | 23 February 1864 |
| 4 | Belgium | 5 June 1867 |
| — | Holy See | 15 December 1927 |
| 5 | Chile | 19 July 1945 |
| 6 | Netherlands | 3 May 1949 |
| 7 | Spain | 15 May 1950 |
| 8 | Lebanon | 1 January 1951 |
| 9 | Italy | 5 October 1951 |
| 10 | Haiti | 8 July 1952 |
| 11 | Germany | 23 July 1953 |
| 12 | Ghana | June 1957 |
| 13 | Israel | 22 August 1957 |
| 14 | Tunisia | 1957 |
| 15 | Ethiopia | 4 June 1958 |
| 16 | Sweden | 6 June 1958 |
| 17 | Egypt | 11 June 1958 |
| 18 | Turkey | 1 August 1958 |
| 19 | Dominican Republic | 18 December 1958 |
| 20 | Guinea | 6 March 1959 |
| 21 | Serbia | 15 September 1959 |
| — | Sovereign Military Order of Malta | 1959 |
| 22 | Argentina | 8 January 1960 |
| 23 | Morocco | 5 April 1960 |
| 24 | Democratic Republic of the Congo | 30 June 1960 |
| 25 | India | 7 July 1960 |
| 26 | Switzerland | 19 July 1960 |
| 27 | Togo | 29 July 1960 |
| 28 | Nigeria | 1 October 1960 |
| 29 | Mali | 14 October 1960 |
| 30 | Cameroon | 23 November 1960 |
| 31 | Luxembourg | 20 January 1961 |
| 32 | Ivory Coast | 31 July 1961 |
| 33 | Japan | September 1961 |
| 34 | Sierra Leone | 8 June 1962 |
| 35 | Sudan | 8 August 1962 |
| 36 | Senegal | 1962 |
| 37 | Austria | 25 June 1963 |
| 38 | Denmark | 11 July 1963 |
| 39 | Benin | 1963 |
| 40 | Burkina Faso | 1963 |
| 41 | Niger | 1963 |
| 42 | South Korea | 18 March 1964 |
| 43 | Kenya | 21 May 1964 |
| 44 | Norway | 17 February 1965 |
| 45 | Venezuela | 16 March 1965 |
| 46 | Gambia | 3 November 1965 |
| 47 | Trinidad and Tobago | 6 December 1965 |
| 48 | Indonesia | 1965 |
| 49 | Tanzania | 27 May 1966 |
| 50 | Thailand | 2 February 1967 |
| 51 | Mauritania | 13 March 1967 |
| 52 | Uganda | 5 April 1967 |
| 53 | Lesotho | 20 October 1968 |
| 54 | Pakistan | 1969 |
| 55 | Finland | 24 March 1970 |
| 56 | Central African Republic | 5 May 1970 |
| 57 | Canada | 24 February 1971 |
| 58 | Algeria | 31 December 1971 |
| 59 | Kuwait | 1971 |
| 60 | Zambia | 3 April 1972 |
| 61 | Romania | 30 April 1972 |
| 62 | Russia | 7 June 1972 |
| 63 | Poland | 30 May 1973 |
| 64 | Czech Republic | 15 October 1973 |
| 65 | North Korea | 20 December 1973 |
| 66 | Guinea-Bissau | 20 February 1974 |
| 67 | Saudi Arabia | 30 March 1974 |
| 68 | Libya | 1 April 1974 |
| 69 | Cuba | 19 April 1974 |
| 70 | Philippines | 20 May 1974 |
| 71 | Greece | 29 May 1974 |
| 72 | Bangladesh | 19 August 1974 |
| 73 | Bulgaria | 1 November 1974 |
| 74 | Guyana | 11 November 1974 |
| 75 | Portugal | 19 March 1975 |
| 76 | Iran | 2 June 1975 |
| 77 | Gabon | 17 June 1975 |
| 78 | Cape Verde | 27 July 1975 |
| 79 | Mongolia | 23 April 1976 |
| 80 | Brazil | 8 June 1976 |
| 81 | Mexico | 22 June 1976 |
| 82 | Hungary | 15 July 1976 |
| 83 | China | 17 February 1977 |
| 84 | Republic of the Congo | 10 August 1979 |
| 85 | Ecuador | 31 March 1980 |
| 86 | Equatorial Guinea | 1980 |
| 87 | Iraq | 1980 |
| 88 | Somalia | 1980 |
| 89 | Zimbabwe | 15 October 1982 |
| 90 | Singapore | 7 January 1987 |
| 91 | Colombia | 28 September 1988 |
| 92 | Namibia | 28 April 1990 |
| 93 | Slovenia | 30 March 1993 |
| 94 | Azerbaijan | 22 May 1996 |
| 95 | South Africa | 10 January 1997 |
| 96 | Malaysia | 1997 |
| 97 | Slovakia | 6 March 1998 |
| 98 | Ukraine | 24 September 1998 |
| 99 | Cyprus | 30 November 2000 |
| 100 | Ireland | 2004 |
| 101 | Iceland | 28 November 2006 |
| 102 | Saint Vincent and the Grenadines | 2 May 2007 |
| 103 | Uruguay | 1 June 2007 |
| 104 | Estonia | 28 June 2007 |
| 105 | Jordan | 10 December 2007 |
| 106 | Malta | 20 May 2008 |
| 107 | Australia | 26 September 2008 |
| 108 | Mozambique | 17 December 2008 |
| 109 | Malawi | 26 February 2009 |
| 110 | United Arab Emirates | 6 May 2009 |
| 111 | Sri Lanka | 17 July 2009 |
| 112 | Qatar | 3 November 2009 |
| 113 | Angola | 3 December 2009 |
| 114 | Bosnia and Herzegovina | 23 February 2010 |
| 115 | Georgia | 4 March 2010 |
| 116 | Botswana | 21 September 2010 |
| 117 | Tuvalu | 28 August 2012 |
| 118 | Fiji | 15 November 2012 |
| 119 | Montenegro | 4 April 2014 |
| 120 | Latvia | 10 April 2014 |
| 121 | Lithuania | 23 April 2014 |
| 122 | New Zealand | 26 August 2014 |
| 123 | Belarus | 27 April 2016 |
| 124 | Kazakhstan | 27 April 2016 |
| 125 | Kyrgyzstan | 17 June 2016 |
| 126 | Vietnam | 28 June 2016 |
| 127 | Laos | 12 August 2016 |
| 128 | Myanmar | 5 May 2017 |
| 129 | Rwanda | 16 May 2017 |
| 130 | Nepal | 17 August 2017 |
| 131 | Armenia | 22 September 2017 |
| — | Kosovo | 27 May 2018 |
| 132 | Burundi | 22 January 2020 |
| 133 | Tajikistan | 21 September 2022 |
| 134 | Jamaica | 22 September 2022 |
| 135 | Barbados | 27 February 2024 |
| 136 | Bahrain | 26 September 2024 |
| 137 | Croatia | 26 September 2024 |
| 138 | Uzbekistan | 26 September 2024 |
| 139 | Bolivia | 2024 |
| 140 | Seychelles | 13 February 2026 |
| 141 | Monaco | 10 March 2026 |
| 142 | Oman | 9 November 2026 |
| 143 | Costa Rica | Unknown |
| 144 | South Sudan | Unknown |

== Bilateral relations ==
=== Africa ===
| Country | Formal Relations Began | Notes |
|---|---|---|
| Guinea | 6 March 1959 | Both countries established diplomatic relations on 6 March 1959 when Mr. Edward Peal, the Liberian Ambassador to the Republic of Guinea, presented his credentials to President S. Toure. The First Liberian Civil War, instigated by Charles Taylor and the National Patriotic Front of Liberia (NPFL) on December 24, 1989, eventually spread to neighboring Sierra Leone in 1991 when dissidents of the Revolutionary United Front (RUF), led by Foday Sankoh, began using Liberia as a staging ground for NPFL backed military assaults on border towns in Sierra Leone. By 1992, 120,000 people had fled from Sierra Leone to Guinea due to the RUF's practice of targeting civilians. In 2001, Liberian forces along with the RUF began attacking and burning refugee camps and Guinean villages along the border. In an inflammatory speech the Guinean president Lansana Conté, blamed the refugees for the border destabilization and alleged that the vast majority of refugees were rebels. He called for the Guinean population to defend its nation. This call precipitated attacks, beatings, rapes, and abductions of refugees by Guinean police and military forces. This reversal of Guinea's previously open policy towards refugees, further escalated the refugee crisis as refugees attempted to cross back through RUF territory. By 2002, the United Nations estimated that three million people, or one in five people of the Mano River Union countries, were displaced.: Guinea has an embassy in Monrovia.; Liberia has an embassy in Conakry. |
| Libya | 1 April 1974 | See Liberia–Libya relations Both countries established diplomatic relations on 1 April 1974. Liberia's relationship with Libya has been characterized by Muammar Gaddafi's attempts at bringing Liberia under greater Libyan influence. Relations under the Doe administration were poor, owing to efforts by the United States to undermine Gaddafi's leverage, and Doe's cynicism of the Libyan leader's intentions. Gaddafi financially and militarily backed rebel leader Charles Taylor, under whose regime Liberia sought closer relations with Libya. After Taylor was ousted in 2003, Liberia continued to maintain diplomatic relations with Libya, only severing them after the onset of the Libyan Civil War, and just recently reestablishing them. |
| Namibia | 28 April 1990 | Both countries established diplomatic relations on 28 April 1990 In 1960, Liberia and Ethiopia brought litigation against apartheid South Africa in the International Court of Justice to end its illegal occupation of Namibia. As part of Liberia's support for Namibia's liberation struggle, many Namibian students received Liberian passports which helped them study abroad. As of July 2008, a total of 5,900 Namibia Defence Force troops had been rotated through Liberia as part of the United Nations Mission in Liberia. Namibia maintained a battalion of about 800 personnel in Grand Cape Mount county for several years, for most of the period part of UNMIL Sector 2, headquartered at Tubmanburg. In May 2005, Namibian troops were accused of sexual exploitation of young girls and women; three Namibian soldiers were sent home from the force after a United Nations investigation found them guilty of "engaging in sexual activity with civilians", which is against United Nations rules for peacekeepers.: Liberia is accredited to Namibia from its embassy in Pretoria, South Africa.; Namibia is accredited to Liberia from its high commission in Abuja, Nigeria. |
| Sahrawi Arab Democratic Republic | | Liberia began recognizing the SADR on 31 July 1985.; Liberia revoked its recognition in September 1997.; By 2012, Liberia had re-established relations with the SADR. |
| Sierra Leone | 8 June 1962 | See Liberia-Sierra Leone relations Both countries established diplomatic relations on 8 June 1962 when has been appointed first ambassador of Liberia to Sierra Leone Mr. Henry B. Fahnbulleh. The First Liberian Civil War, instigated by Charles Taylor and the National Patriotic Front of Liberia (NPFL) on December 24, 1989, eventually spread to neighboring Sierra Leone in 1991 when dissidents of the Revolutionary United Front (RUF), led by Foday Sankoh, began using Liberia as a staging ground for NPFL backed military assaults on border towns in Sierra Leone. Guinea and Sierra Leone have accused Liberia of backing rebels who have devastated their countries.: Liberia has an embassy in Freetown.; Sierra Leone has an embassy in Monrovia. |

=== Americas ===
| Country | Formal Relations Began | Notes |
|---|---|---|
| Haiti | 29 June 1952 | Both countries established diplomatic relations on 29 June 1952.: Haiti and Liberia recognized each other in 1864.; The two countries established treaties of friendship and commerce the same year. |
| Mexico | 22 June 1976 | Both countries established diplomatic relations on 22 June 1976: Liberia is accredited to Mexico from its embassy in Washington, D.C., United States.; Mexico is accredited to Liberia from its embassy in Accra, Ghana. |
| United States | 23 February 1864 | Both countries established diplomatic relations on 23 February 1864 See Liberia–United States relations U.S. relations with Liberia date back to 1819 when the US Congress appropriated $100,000 for the establishment of Liberia. After official US recognition of Liberia in 1862, the two nations shared very close ties until strains in the 1970s due to Liberia's establishment of diplomatic relations with the Soviet Union and other Eastern Bloc countries. During the 1980s, the United States forged especially close ties with Liberia as part of a Cold War effort to suppress socialist and Marxist movements in Africa. Liberia received between $500 million and $1.3 billion during the 1980s from the United States government. The rise of Charles Taylor's government, the Liberian Civil War, regional instability and human rights abuses interrupted the previously close relations between Liberia and the United States. The United States cut direct financial and military aid to the Liberian government, withdrew Peace Corps operations, imposed a travel ban on senior Liberian Government officials, and frequently criticized Charles Taylor's government. Due to intense pressure from the international community and the United States, Charles Taylor resigned his office on August 11, 2003. The resignation and exile of Charles Taylor in 2003 brought changes in diplomatic ties between the United States and Liberia. The United States proposed a United Nations Security Council draft resolution to authorize the deployment of a multi-national stabilization force, and 200 marines as well as warships were sent to Monrovia's airport to support the peace-keeping effort. The United States committed $1.16 billion to Liberia between 2004 and 2006. In 2009, A 17.5 million dollar contract to support elections was offered to Liberia with International Foundation for Electoral Systems as the conduit. This money is meant to support the presidential election of 2011 and the general election of 2014.: Liberia has an embassy in Washington, D.C., and consulate-generals in New York City, Atlanta and Minneapolis.; United States has an embassy in Monrovia. |

=== Asia ===
| Country | Formal Relations Began | Notes |
|---|---|---|
| China | 17 February 1977 | See China–Liberia relations Relations between the People's Republic of China (PRC) and Liberia have been broken and reestablished several times since February 17, 1977, when diplomatic relations between the PRC and Liberia were first formed. The PRC broke off relations with Liberia on October 10, 1989, in response to Liberia's recognition of the Republic of China (Taiwan). Taiwan had offered $200 million in aid to Liberia for education and infrastructure in exchange for this recognition. The PRC reestablished relations with Liberia on August 10, 1993, and opened an embassy in Monrovia, making Liberia one of the few nations with established diplomatic ties to both the PRC and ROC. In 1997, Charles Taylor's government proclaimed to recognize "two Chinas" and the PRC subsequently severed diplomatic relations. Liberia dropped diplomatic relations with the ROC on October 12, 2003, and reestablished ties with the People's Republic of China. This move was seen largely as a result of the PRC's lobbying in the UN and plans to deploy a peacekeeping force in Liberia.: China has an embassy in Monrovia.; Liberia has an embassy in Beijing. |
| India | 7 July 1960 | See India–Liberia relations Both countries established diplomatic relations on 7 July 1960 Indian-Liberian relations have traditionally been strong and cordial with Liberia's full-fledged support for India's stand on Kashmir and India's aspiration for permanent membership on the United Nations Security Council. In recent years, both nations have developed close and extensive cooperation in trade, military and strategic fields. Amidst India's growing role in Liberia, the Liberian Minister of Mines and Energy, Dr. Eugene Shannon visited India in October 2005 to participate in the Confederation of Indian Industry-Africa Conclave. In 2008, the President of Liberia Ellen Johnson Sirleaf was invited to visit India. Major items of Indian exports include engineering goods, pharmaceuticals, two wheelers, transportation equipment, steel and plastic products. Major items of imports are gold, diamonds, timber and metal scrap. Following lifting of United Nations sanctions, timber concessions have been awarded to Indian firms. Overall, Indian investments in Liberia have been increased from US$450 million in 2005 to an estimated $2 billion in 2009.: India has an embassy in Monrovia.; Liberia maintains an honorary consulate in New Delhi. |
| Iran | 2 June 1975 | Both countries established diplomatic relations on 2 June 1975 In 2023, an Iranian drone struck the Liberian flagged chemical tanker Chem Pluto. |
| Israel | 22 August 1957 | See Israel–Liberia relations Both countries established diplomatic relations on 22 August 1957.: Liberia and Israel established ties in 1957 with the accreditation of Israeli ambassador Ehud Avriel.; Liberia severed ties with Israel over the Yom Kippur War in 1973.; Relations are re-established in 1983.; On 8 June 2022, Liberia announced its plans to open a trade office in Jerusalem, which is to become an embassy. |
| Japan | September 1961 | Both countries established diplomatic relations in September 1961; Liberia is accredited to New Zealand from its embassy in Tokyo, Japan. |
| South Korea | 18 March 1964 | Both countries established diplomatic relations on 18 March 1964 In 2001 Bilateral Trade were Exports $7,350,000,000 (Ships, Automobile) Imports $1,270,000 (Used Ships, Mineral Fuel). |
| Turkey | 1 August 1958 | See Liberia–Turkey relations Both countries established diplomatic relations on 1 August 1958: Embassy of Liberia in Brussels is accredited to Turkey.; Turkish Embassy in Accra is accredited to Liberia.; Trade volume between the two countries was US$191.9 million in 2019. |
| Vietnam | 28 June 2016 | Both countries established diplomatic relations on 28 June 2016: Liberia is accredited to Vietnam through its embassy in Beijing, China. |

=== Europe ===
| Country | Formal Relations Began | Notes |
|---|---|---|
| France | 20 April 1852 | See France–Liberia relations Both countries established diplomatic relations on 20 April 1852: France recognized Liberia in 1852.; France has an embassy in Monrovia.; Liberia has an embassy in Paris. |
| Germany | 23 July 1953 | See Germany–Liberia relations Both countries established diplomatic relations on 23 July 1953. Liberia had been recognized by countries which would merge into Germany, such as Lübeck, Bremen, and Hamburg in 1855.: Liberia has an embassy in Berlin.; Germany has an embassy in Monrovia. |
| Netherlands | 3 May 1949 | Both countries established diplomatic relations on 3 May 1949. 27 March 1936 has been accredited Envoy Extraordinary and Minister Plenipotentiary of Liberia to the Netherlands Baron Otto van den Bogaerde van Terbrugge.: The Netherlands recognized Liberia in 1862.; The two countries signed a treaty of friendship, commerce, and navigation on 20 December 1862. |
| Russia | 7 June 1972 | Both countries established diplomatic relations on 7 June 1972. Liberia and Russia resumed bilateral relations in March 2010 and cited a recent exploration of mine by a Russian company as a sign of future trade relations. |
| Spain | 15 May 1950 | See Liberia–Spain relations Both countries established diplomatic relations on 15 May 1950: Liberia is accredited to Spain from its embassy in Paris, France.; Spain is accredited to Liberia from its embassy in Abidjan, Ivory Coast. |
| United Kingdom | 1 August 1849 | See Liberia–United Kingdom relations British Prime Minister David Cameron with Liberian President Ellen Johnson Sirleaf in London, November 2012. Liberia established diplomatic relations with the United Kingdom on 1 August 1849.: Liberia maintains an embassy in London.; The United Kingdom is accredited to Liberia through its embassy in Monrovia.; Both countries share common membership of the Atlantic Co-operation Pact, the International Criminal Court, the United Nations, and the World Trade Organization. Bilaterally the two countries have a Development Partnership. and a Tax Information Exchange Agreement. The UK was amongst the first countries to recognise the new republic. After the visit to the UK in 1848 of President Roberts, Queen Victoria put the Royal Navy ship HMS Amazon at the disposal of him and his family, for his return journey to Liberia. In 1961, Queen Elizabeth II made a state visit to Liberia, arriving at Monrovia on the HMY Britannia. President Tubman made a gift of two Pygmy hippopotamus, which arrived by cargo ship in 1962 and were sent to Whipsnade Zoo. In 1962, President Tubman and his wife visited the UK. |

== Diplomatic Agreements ==
Liberia is a founding member of the United Nations (see Permanent Representative of Liberia to the United Nations) and its specialized agencies and is a member of the African Union (AU), Economic Community of West African States (ECOWAS), African Development Bank (ADB), Mano River Union (MRU) and the Non-Aligned Movement. Liberia is also a member of the International Criminal Court with a Bilateral Immunity Agreement of protection for the US-military (as covered under Article 98).

== See also ==
- List of diplomatic missions in Liberia
- List of diplomatic missions of Liberia
