= France–Liberia relations =

- France: Liberia

France-Liberia relations are the bilateral relations between France and Liberia.

== History ==
France was early to recognize the independence of Liberia. After the Republic of Liberia declared independence on 26 July 1847, France was the second, after the United Kingdom, to recognize it as a sovereign nation in 1852. Joseph Jenkins Roberts spent much of his early terms as Liberian president making state visits to garner recognition for his republic. He held multiple visits with French President Louis Napoleon III, who ultimately gifted Liberia military equipment and uniforms.

=== Territorial disputes ===
Until the 1880s, Liberia and France shared a mostly positive relationship, though rumors of French desires for Liberian land existed in Liberia and the United States since the late 1870s. This positive relationship changed with the Scramble for Africa, and French imperialistic ambitions in West Africa muddied their relations. Previous to the 1880s, France had praised Liberia as a civilizing force in Africa, though after the Berlin Conference, it changed this view, seeing only Europeans as capable of "civilizing" Africans. France had two major colonies bordering Liberia: Guinea to the north and Côte d'Ivoire to the east. In the 1880s, France started to lay claim to territory claimed by Maryland County between the San Pedro and Cavalla Rivers. In 1892, France seized the land. On 8 December 1892, the Liberian government signed an agreement ceding the territory to France. The territory became part of the Côte d'Ivoire colony.

On 18 September 1907, Liberia signed another territorial treaty with France. This time, Liberia ceded much of its claimed northeastern territory. The treaty also specified that if Liberia did not make a military force to protect its borders, then France had the right to implement one in Liberia. This was one of the factors which lead to the creation of the Liberian Frontier Force. On 13 January 1911, France and Liberia signed another territorial agreement, which worked out problems which arose from the 1907 treaty.

=== Economic ties ===
A major loan between France, along with other Western powers including the United Kingdom, the United States, and Germany, was negotiated in 1911, under Liberian President Arthur Barclay, and ratified in 1912, under Liberian President Daniel E. Howard. This was the third, in a series of two other major, uneven loans taken out by the Liberian government. The loan borrowed $1,700,000 for Liberia, with the conditions including that the four countries would be able to each appoint General Receivers of Customs, which limited the powers of the Liberian Secretary of the Treasury. The 1912 loan was paid off in 1926, with a loan from the Finance Corporation of America.

In 2004, Tim Geysbeek of the journal History in Africa explained that France "exerts tremendous economic and political influence" over Liberia. During the Liberian civil wars, France was a major importer of Liberian timber. French firms were dependent on timber from the Liberian conflict zone, with France accounting for 18% of Liberia's timber export. The timber export helped to sustain the Charles Taylor regime. France sanctioned Liberian timber exports in July 2003, after Taylor's exile to Nigeria. In 2019, France was found to be in violation of European Union laws to prevent illegal timber imports, as French firms had been importing large amounts of illegal timber, acquired through bribery and illegal deforestation, from a number of African countries, including Liberia.

All imports from Liberia to France are duty-free and quota-free, with the exception of armaments, as part of the Everything but Arms initiative of the European Union.

=== Recent diplomacy ===
In February 2018, Liberian President George Weah made his first state visit outside of Africa to France, where he met with French President Emmanuel Macron. The current Liberian ambassador to France is Teeko Tozay Yorlay, who presented his credentials to President Macron in March 2025. The current French ambassador to Liberia Isabelle Le Guellec has served since September 2023.

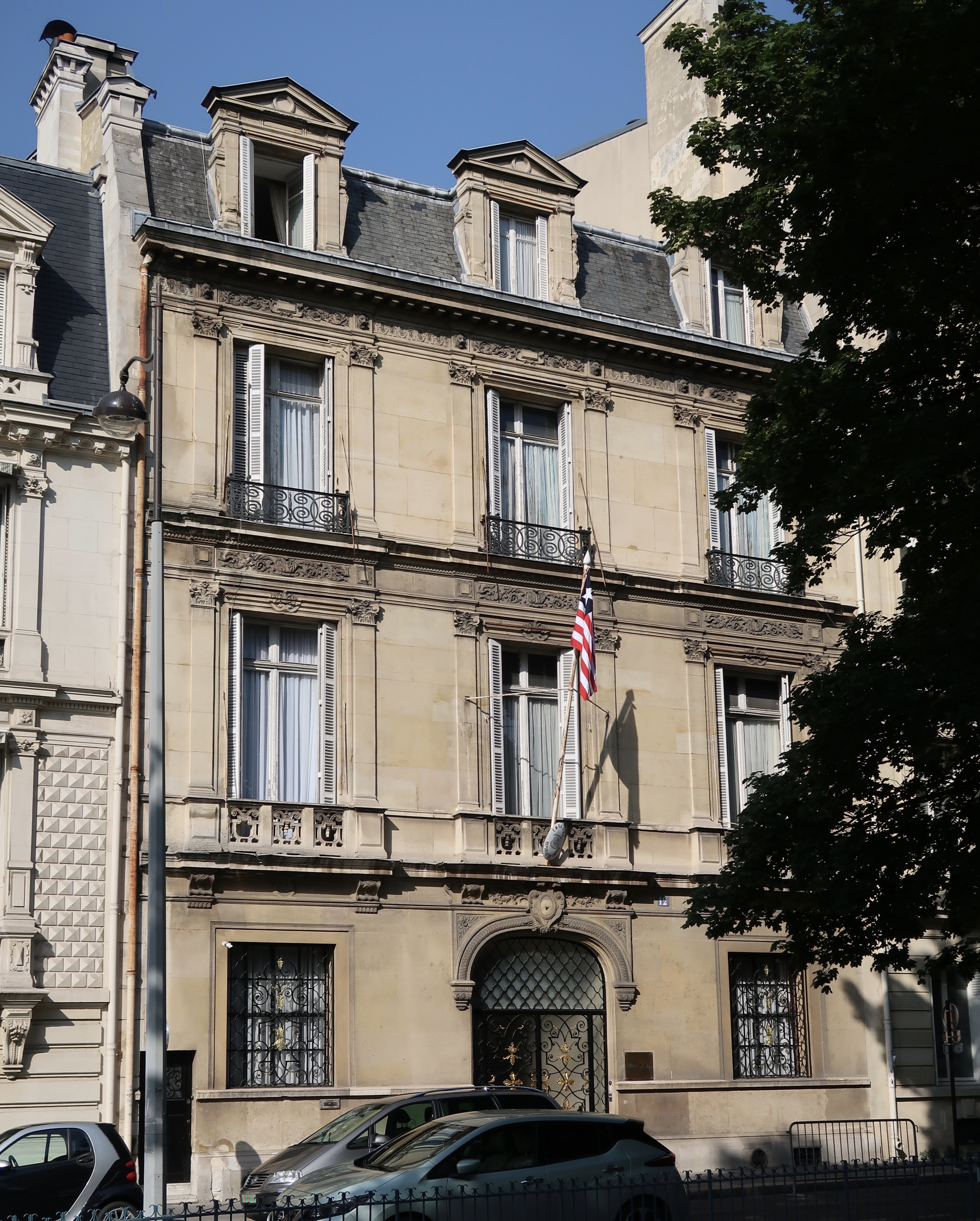
Embassy of Liberia in Paris

== Resident diplomatic missions ==
- France has an embassy in Monrovia.
- Liberia has an embassy in Paris.

== See also ==
- Foreign relations of France
- Foreign relations of Liberia
- France–Africa relations
- Guinea–Liberia border
- Ivory Coast–Liberia border
