= Bo Waterside =

Village in Grand Cape Mount County, Liberia

Coordinates: 7.0107°N 11.373°W

- Interactive map of Bo Waterside
- Country: Liberia
- County: Grand Cape Mount County

Bo Waterside is a town in Grand Cape Mount County, Liberia on the Mano River. It was a key border crossing between Liberia and Sierra Leone until 1990, when it closed after the launch of Charles Taylor's National Patriotic Front of Liberia invasion from Sierra Leone. The border crossing officially re-opened in June 2007 in an official ceremony involving government officials, humanitarian workers and significant amounts of foreign press coverage.
