= Liberia–Sierra Leone border =

International border

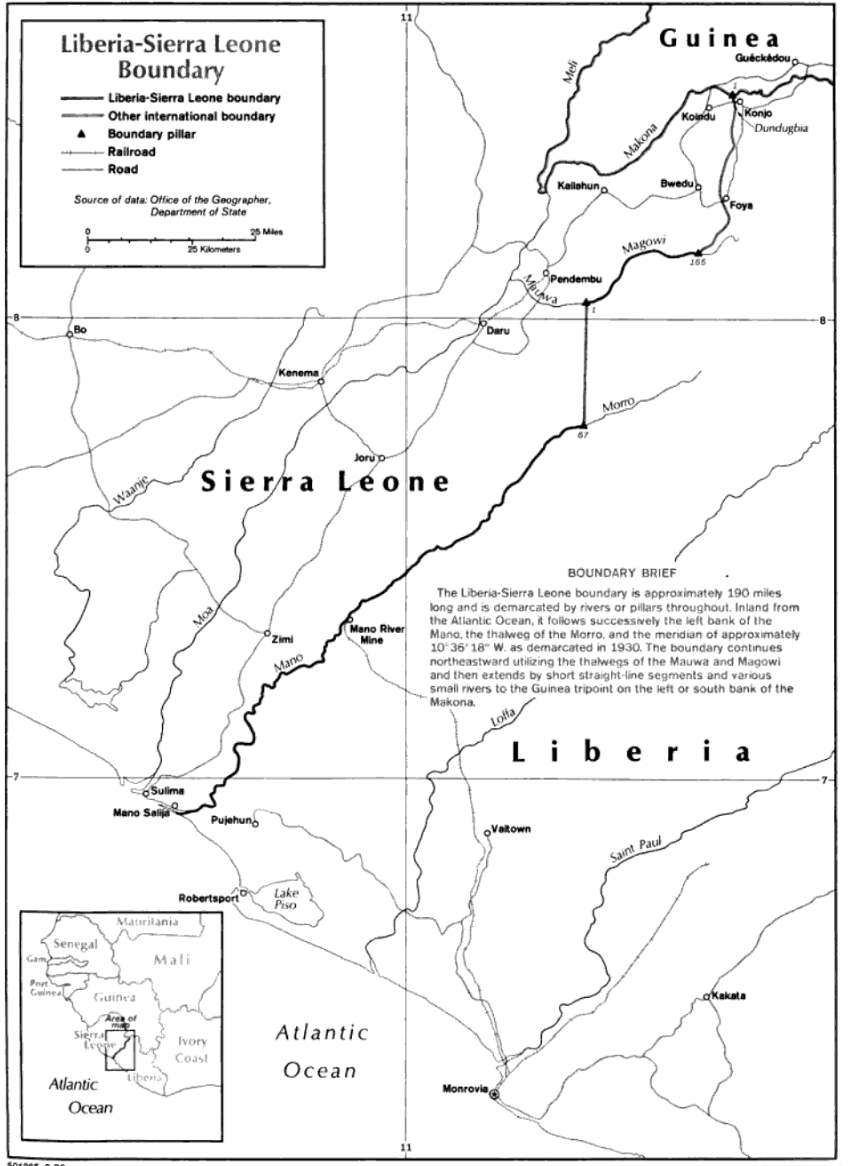
Map of the Liberia-Sierra Leone border

The Liberia–Sierra Leone border is 299 km (185 mi) in length and runs from the tripoint with Guinea in the north-east to the Atlantic Ocean in the south-west.

== Description ==
The border starts in the north at the tripoint with Guinea in the Makona river, and then proceeds overland in a south-westerly direction, before following the Magowi river for some distance; this section of the border encompasses the so-called ‘Parrot’s Beak’ of Sierra Leone's Kailahun District. The boundary then proceeds via a straight line south to the Morro river, and then follows this river and the Mano south-west out to the Atlantic.

== History ==
Sierra Leone was founded by the British in the 1780s as haven for rescued and freed slaves; the area around Freetown was made a crown colony in 1808 and British rule was gradually extended over the interior over the following decades. Liberia was founded as a colony for freed American slaves in 1822; various settlements were founded along the coast in the following years, with the bulk of them uniting to create the Republic of Liberia in 1847 (the Republic of Maryland joined later in 1857).

As the African interior began to be carved up due to the Scramble for Africa in the 1880s, an Anglo-Liberian boundary treaty was signed on 11 November 1885, which utilised the Mano river as the boundary; this was then extended further northwards by mutual agreement in June 1903. A treaty between France and Liberia delimiting the French Guinea–Liberia border resulted in Liberia ceding a sizeable strip of territory to France, and thereby shortened the Liberia-Sierra Leone boundary to roughly its current length. Britain and Liberia further modified the boundary in January 1911, with Liberia ceding the ‘Parrot’s Beak’ area to Sierra Leone in exchange for territories east the Mano river. This new boundary was then demarcated by a joint commission in 1913–14, and confirmed by agreement in 1917. Some further small adjustments were approved by treaty in January 1930, with the land sections of the border being marked on the ground with pillars.

Sierra Leone gained independence in 1961 and the frontier then became one between two independent states. During the 1999s-early 2000s both states were engulfed in civil war and the border region became very unstable, with armed rebels and refugees frequently crossing the border.

== Settlements near the border ==
=== Liberia ===
- Kongo
- Meinke

=== Sierra Leone ===
- Baiwala
- Bandajuma
- Diselami
- Gonohun

== See also ==
- Liberia–Sierra Leone relations
