= Liberia–Spain relations =

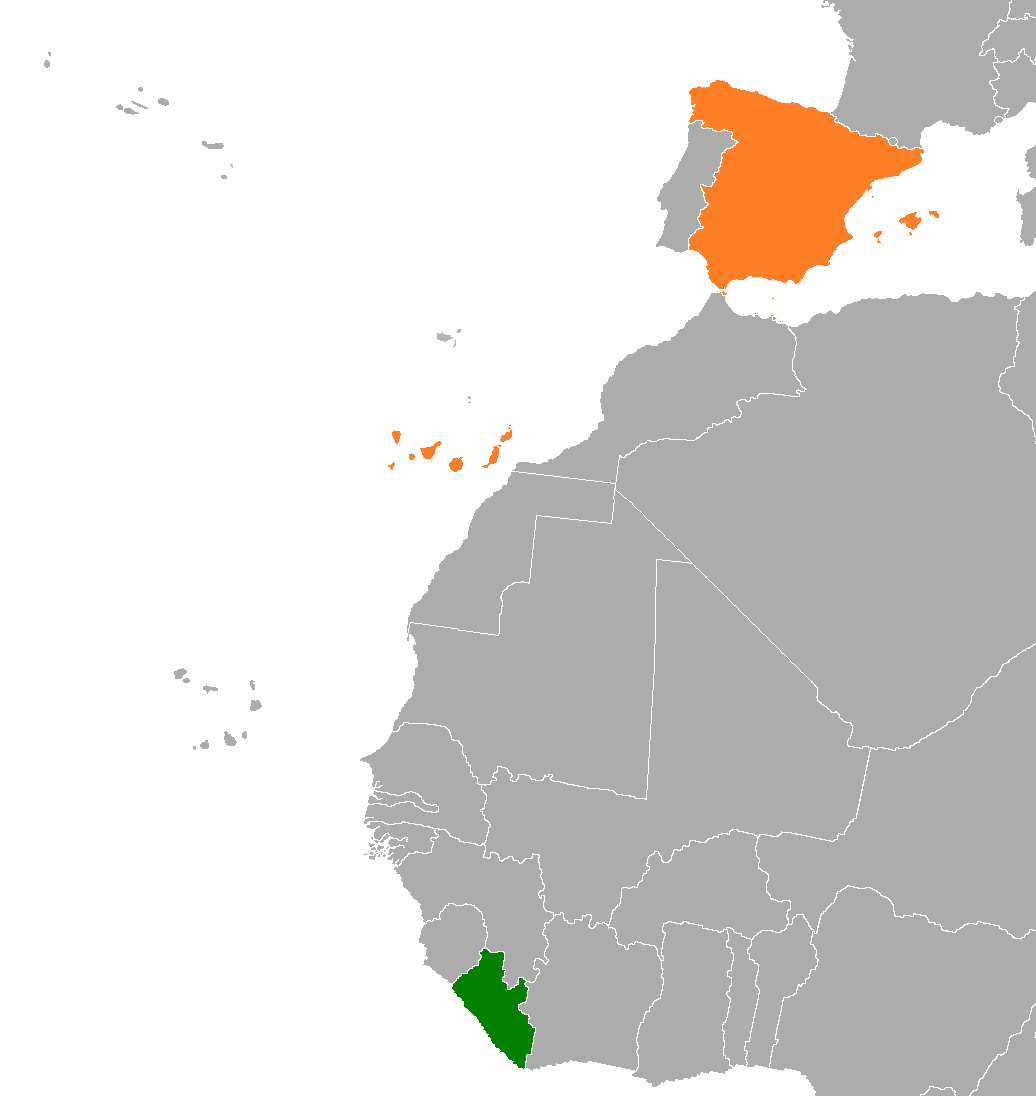

- Liberia: Spain

Liberia–Spain relations are the bilateral and diplomatic relations between these two countries. Liberia has no embassy in Madrid but its embassy in Paris is accredited for Spain but has two consulates in Las Palmas de Gran Canaria and Madrid. Spain does not have an embassy in Liberia, but its embassy in Abidjan, Ivory Coast is accredited for Liberia, and it has a consulate in Monrovia.

== Diplomatic relations ==
Relationships considered cordial and fluid at the political and institutional level. The Spanish Embassy in Monrovia was closed in 1990 after the start of the civil war, currently dealing with current affairs and the Spanish Embassy in Abidjan (Ivory Coast) being accredited before the Liberian authorities. Between August 2007 and the end of 2014 Spain had displaced a diplomat in Monrovia, also in charge of covering Sierra Leone.

On March 7 of 2009 the First Vice President of the Government of Spain, María Teresa Fernández de la Vega, made an official trip to Liberia, accompanied by the Secretary of State for Cooperation, Soraya Rodríguez, and the Secretary of State for Foreign Affairs, Ángel Lossada.

== Cooperation ==
Although Liberia has not traditionally been a country of cooperation for Spain, and has not been a priority country in the master plans of Spanish cooperation, Spain's commitment to this West African country has become evident in recent years through the realization and participation (bilaterally and multilaterally) in a whole series of cooperation actions aimed at improving the living conditions of the citizenship or dealing with the consequences produced by the armed conflict, actions that have contributed to stabilize politics and socially the country and, therefore, ultimately, to consolidate the peace process in Liberia.

== Trade ==
All imports from Liberia to Spain are duty-free and quota-free, with the exception of armaments, as part of the Everything but Arms initiative of the European Union.

== See also ==
- Foreign relations of Liberia
- Foreign relations of Spain
