= Liberia–Sierra Leone relations =

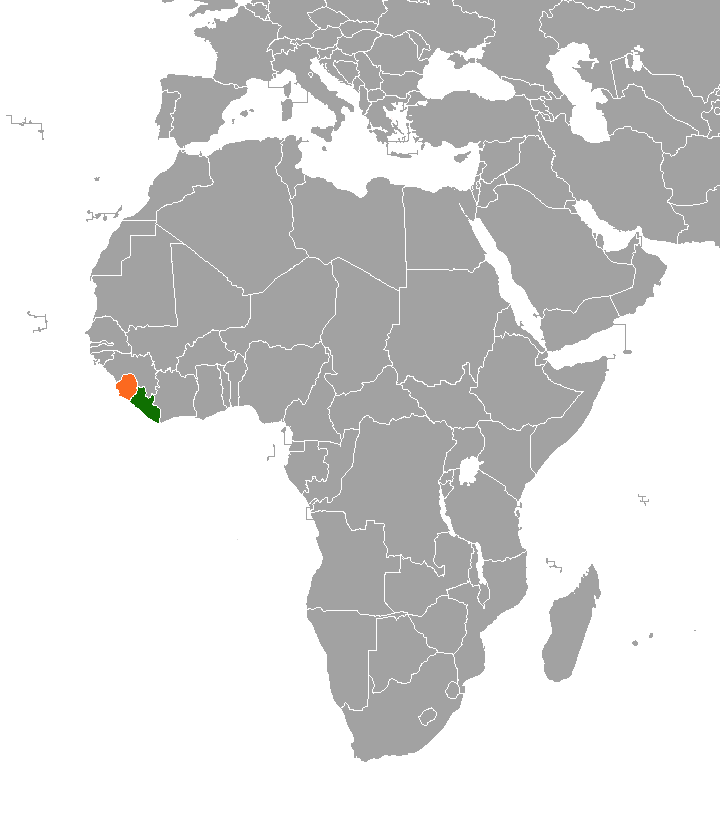

- Liberia: Sierra Leone

Liberia–Sierra Leone relations refers to the historical and current relationship between Liberia and Sierra Leone. The two countries signed a non-aggression pact in 2007 when Sierra Leonean President Ernest Bai Koroma took office. In January 2011, an African diplomat described relations as "cordial".

== History ==
=== Ex-slave repatriations ===
Both states were destinations for ex-slaves from the Americas as well as people rescued by the British Navy from slave ships en route to the Americas. Those who were resettled in both territories became known as Sierra Leone Creoles and Americo-Liberians respectively, and eventually formed the local elites of both states. Liberia became independent in 1847 from the United States, while Sierra Leone remained a colony of the United Kingdom until 1961.

=== Relations under Doe and Taylor ===
Relations were tense between Liberia and its neighbors, including Sierra Leone, during the presidencies of Samuel Doe and Charles Taylor. In 1983, Liberian General Thomas Quiwonkpa fled to Sierra Leone after being charged with attempting a Coup d'état. Under Taylor, the Sierra Leonean Armed Forces clashed with the Armed Forces of Liberia, which left several people dead.

During the sessions of the Special Court for Sierra Leone, prosecutors claimed that Charles Taylor had actively participated in directing from Liberia the strategies of the Revolutionary United Front, a rebel group in Sierra Leone; among the allegations was that he had arranged to transport RUF commanders to Monrovia to meet with them personally.

=== Refugees and post-war relations ===
Sierra Leone was the destination for more than 40,000 Liberian refugees who fled during the First and Second Liberian Civil Wars. Eight camps were set up in Sierra Leone's Kenema District in its Eastern Province. Following the end of the wars, a repatriation campaign was started by the United Nations High Commissioner for Refugees (UNHCR) to return Liberians home. Instead of returning to Liberia, several thousand refugees opted to integrate into the Sierra Leonean communities they had fled to. In June 2007, Bo Waterside, a border crossing, reopened. It closed in 1990 after Taylor invaded Liberia and took over the Liberian government. It was heralded by Liberia as a sign of improving relations and a boost for bilateral trade, because it shortened the traveling distance between Monrovia and Freetown.

== See also ==
- Foreign relations of Liberia
- Foreign relations of Sierra Leone
- Liberia–Sierra Leone border
