= Liberia–Libya relations =

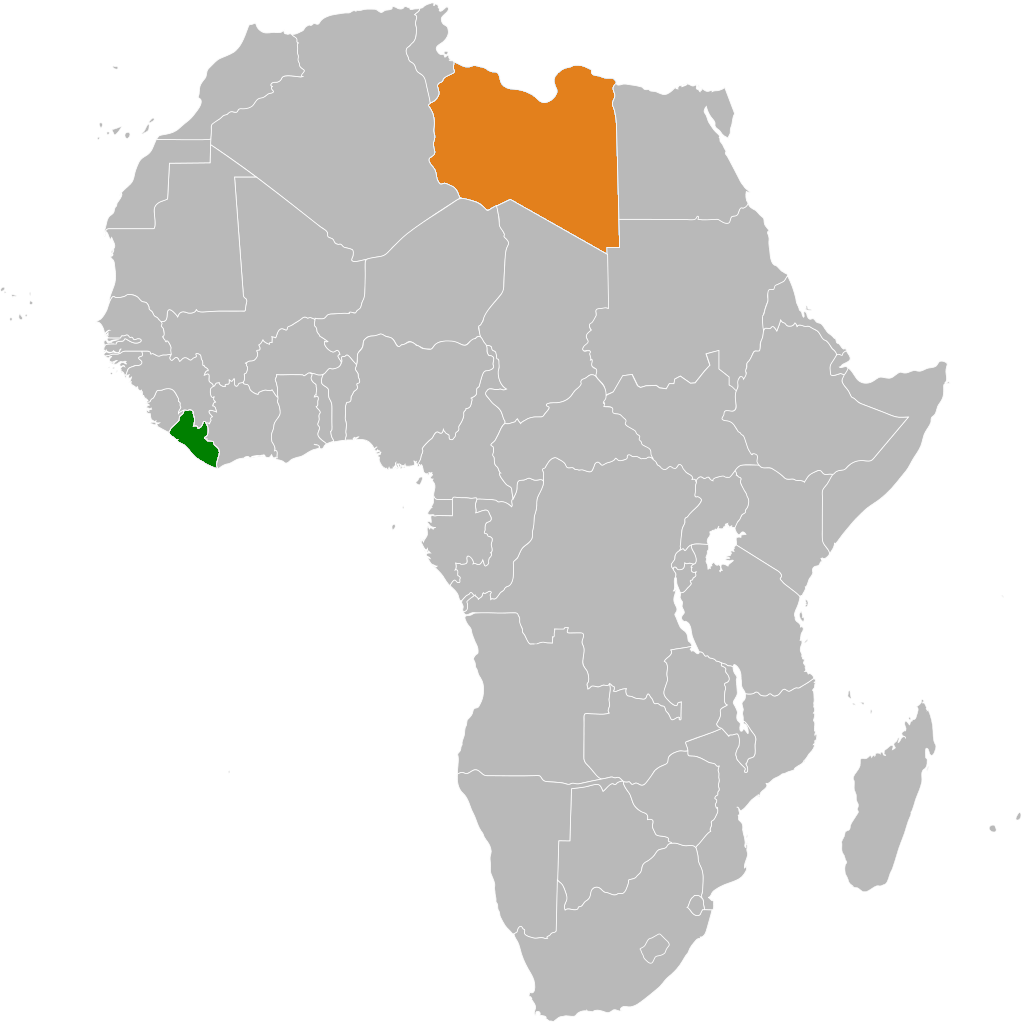

- Liberia: Libya

Liberia–Libya relations have historically revolved around the respective policies of Libya and the Republic of Liberia toward external influence in Africa. This history is in large part founded in Liberia's commitments to its original sponsor, the United States, and the pan-African unity ambitions of Libyan despot Muammar Gaddafi. Gaddafi initially welcomed the overthrow of the longstanding Americo-Liberian regime by Samuel Doe but then also supported Charles Taylor in launching a civil war against Doe. Each country maintains an embassy in the other's capital.

== History ==
Days after the 1980 Liberian coup d'état that overthrew the government of William R. Tolbert Jr., the Libyan government under Muammar Gaddafi recognized the government of coup leader Samuel Doe, the first African country to do so. Doe was also given an invitation by Gaddafi to visit the Libyan capital of Tripoli, much to the concern of the United States. However this diplomatic cordiality by the Libyan regime was met with skepticism and suspicion by Doe who surmised that Gaddafi was attempting to bring Liberia into Libya's sphere of influence as part of his Pan-African ambitions. U.S. Assistant Secretary of State Richard Moose reportedly flew to Liberia in a chartered jet with $10 million in cash after the coup to urge Doe not to turn to Libya for financial assistance. The Libyan embassy in Monrovia was closed down and its diplomats expelled.

In a 1983 interview Doe said, "Qaddafi is a man who, I think, would like to lead the whole continent of Africa, which is impossible to do," adding that Gaddafi was destabilizing the continent by sponsoring terrorist activities, "Qaddafi pays terrorists to carry explosives to other African countries, and of course we in Liberia are aware of Qaddafi's threat, and we're very cautious about that." After war broke out between Libya and Chad, Doe sent a team of military officers to Israel to obtain intelligence about Libya.

Motivated by a desire to contain Nigeria and a dislike of Doe, Gaddafi began financing opposition groups in Liberia, among them Charles Taylor's National Patriotic Front of Liberia, a group whose members received weapons training in Libya. Doe was killed during the war and his body was made to disappear.

=== Taylor Era ===
After Charles Taylor came to power in Liberia after the conclusion First Liberian Civil War, diplomatic relations with Libya were restored. Taylor's lieutenant, Moses Blah who had trained with Taylor in Libya before the civil war, was appointed to be the country's ambassador to Libya. Samuel Dokie, a former ally of Taylor who also trained in Libya, called Taylor, "Qaddafi's surrogate," and labeled his election as, "Qaddafi's biggest victory in Africa."

== Modern era ==
With the outbreak of the Libyan Civil War, Gaddafi turned to sub-Saharan African mercenaries to supplement his forces. Many of these mercenaries were Liberians who had previously fought with Charles Taylor. Liberia once again broke relations with Libya in April 2011. After the Libyan elections of 7 July 2012, Liberia renewed relations with Tripoli on July 16. In 2017, a protest was held outside the Libyan embassy in Monrovia demanding better treatment of African migrants apprehended in Libya, accusing the country of torturing and killing Liberians.

== See also ==
- Foreign relations of Liberia
- Foreign relations of Libya
- Pan-Africanism
- National Patriotic Front of Liberia
- Charles Taylor
