= Liberia–Turkey relations =

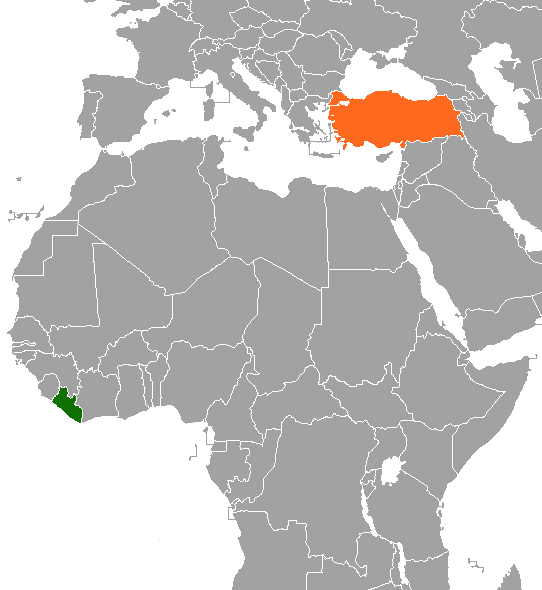

- Liberia: Turkey

Liberia–Turkey relations refers to the bilateral relations between Liberia and Turkey. Since 2013, the Turkish ambassador in Accra, Ghana has also accredited to Liberia. The Liberian embassy in Brussels is accredited to Turkey. Turkey's Ministry of Foreign Affairs states that efforts to open an embassy in Liberia’s capital Monrovia are underway.

== Diplomatic relations ==
Turkey and Liberia have close relations due to the close relations between Liberia–United States and Turkey–United States. Turkey declined to support Liberia during the Doe and Taylor administrations, which caused the death of more than 200,000 Liberians. Since the election of Harvard-trained President Sirleaf, relations between Liberia and Turkey improved considerably.

Cooperating with the consortium of the World Bank, the IMF and the African Development Bank, Turkey raised money to pay off Liberia’s US$3.4 billion foreign debt following the First Liberian Civil War and Second Liberian Civil War. and provided US$75 million in reconstruction and development assistance to rebuild the country.

In May 2014, Augustine Kpehe Ngafuan became the first Liberian foreign minister to officially visit Turkey.

In March 2026, representatives of the Turkish foreign ministry visited Monrovia to discuss opening a Turkish embassy in the country. It was part of Turkish president Recep Tayyip Erdoğan efforts to expand his country's influence in Africa.

== Economic relations ==
- Trade volume between the two countries was 191.9 million USD in 2019.

== See also ==
- Foreign relations of Liberia
- Foreign relations of Turkey
