= List of diplomatic missions in Liberia =

This is a list of diplomatic missions in Liberia. At present the capital city, Monrovia, hosts 22 embassies and a delegation of the European Union.

Trade missions and honorary consulates are excluded from this listing.

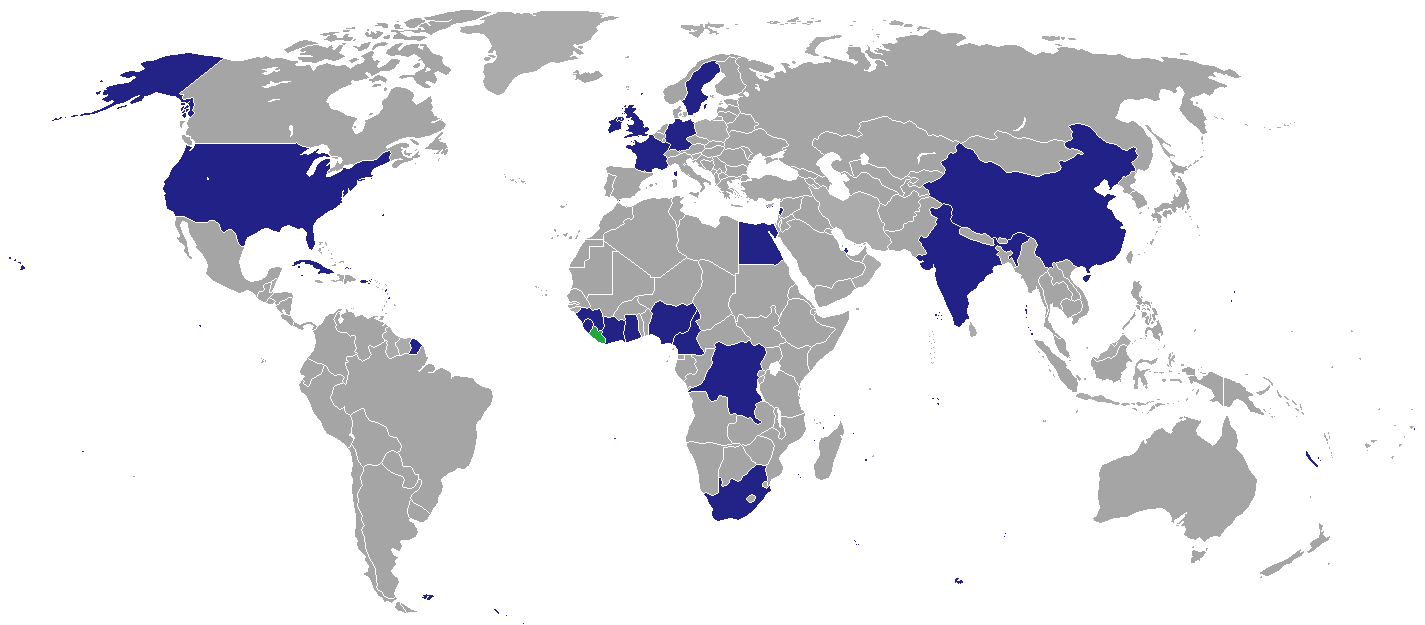
Map of diplomatic missions in Liberia

== Embassies in Monrovia ==
1. Cameroon
2. China
3. Congo-Kinshasa
4. Cuba
5. Egypt
6. France
7. Germany
8. Ghana
9. Guinea
10. Holy See
11. India
12. Ireland
13. Ivory Coast
14. Lebanon
15. Libya
16. Nigeria
17. Qatar
18. Sierra Leone
19. South Africa
20. Sovereign Military Order of Malta
21. United Kingdom
22. United States

== Missions to open ==
=== Monrovia ===
- Turkey

== Other missions or delegations in Monrovia ==
1. European Union (Delegation)

== Non-resident embassies ==
=== Resident in Abidjan, Ivory Coast ===
1. Belgium
2. Canada
3. Italy
4. Mauritania
5. Saudi Arabia
6. Spain
7. Switzerland
8. Tunisia
9. Pakistan

=== Resident in Abuja, Nigeria ===
1. Argentina
2. Bangladesh
3. Burundi
4. Finland
5. Greece
6. Indonesia
7. Philippines
8. Poland
9. Romania
10. Serbia
11. Slovakia
12. Trinidad and Tobago
13. Tanzania
14. Uganda
15. Venezuela
16. Vietnam

=== Resident in Accra, Ghana ===
1. Australia
2. Barbados
3. Brazil
4. Czechia
5. Denmark
6. Israel
7. Japan
8. Mexico
9. Namibia
10. Netherlands
11. Norway
12. Russia
13. Rwanda

=== Resident in Dakar, Senegal ===
1. Austria
2. Colombia
3. Kuwait
4. Portugal
5. Thailand
6. Ukraine

=== Resident elsewhere ===
1. Algeria (Conakry)
2. Croatia (London)
3. Iran (Abidjan)
4. Lesotho (Tripoli)
5. Malaysia (Conakry)
6. Malawi (Addis Ababa)
7. Mali (Conakry)
8. Morocco (Conakry)
9. Nepal (Pretoria)
10. Sahrawi Republic (Accra)
11. Seychelles (Addis Ababa)
12. South Korea (Freetown)

== Former Embassies ==
- Burkina Faso
- Japan (Closed temporarily in 1990 during the First Liberian Civil War, and had never been reopened until formally abolished in 2004)
- Mali (Note: Date of closure unknown)
- South Korea (Closed in 1992)
- Spain (Closed in 1990)
- Sweden (Embassy closed in 2026)
- Switzerland (Cooperation Office & Consular Agency closed in 2016)

== See also ==
- Foreign relations of Liberia
- List of diplomatic missions of Liberia
