= Israel–Liberia relations =

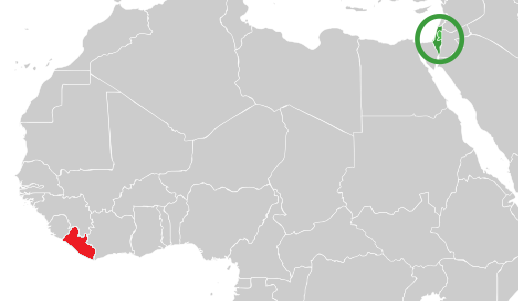

- Israel: Liberia

Israel–Liberia relations refer to the bilateral relations between the State of Israel and the Republic of Liberia. Liberia was one of the United Nations member states to vote in favor of establishing a Jewish state in Palestine in 1947. Israel and Liberia established relations in the late 1950s. The administration of William Tolbert severed ties with the Israeli government in 1973 in response to the Yom Kippur War, but they were re-established in 1983 by Samuel Doe, who succeeded Tolbert via coup.

== History ==
Before Israeli statehood, Liberian statesmen such as Edward Wilmot Blyden found parallels between the history of the Jewish people and the initial Americo-Liberian settlers, as they were both oppressed peoples that sought statehood in the form of a return to a perceived "homeland" as an escape from persecution. As such, Blyden saw similarities in the Back-to-Africa movement and Zionism. Blyden, along with other prominent Americo-Liberian leaders, was a Christian Zionist. Israeli historian Yekutiel Gershoni posited that historical similarities between the two countries helped strengthen their early bonds.

Joseph Massad, a critic of Israel, also saw major similarities between Israel and Liberia. He described them both as oppressive, settler colonial projects rooted in Protestant ideology and backed by Western powers. In an opinion piece for Middle East Eye, he compared the two countries with the statement, "Like the Israelis who champion their freedom from antisemitism with no regard to the Palestinians, the Americo-Liberians established their independent state with no regard to the indigenous Africans."

=== Tubman administration ===
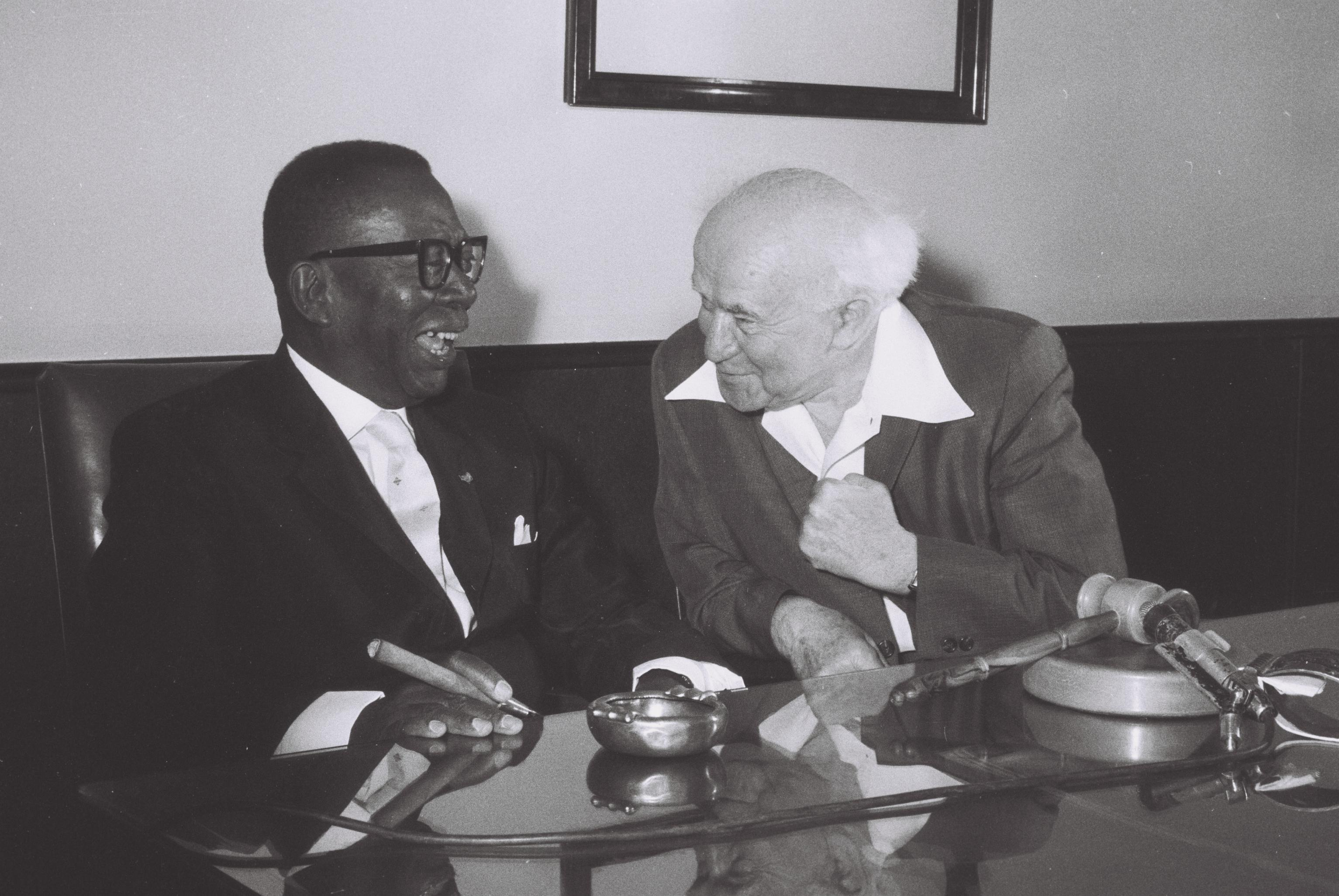
Liberian president William Tubman with Israeli prime minister David Ben-Gurion in 1962.

Liberia was one of the 33 United Nations member states to vote in favor of statehood for Israel on 29 November 1947. Liberia initially opposed the partition plan, but the United States threatened to cut crucial aid to the country if it voted against the plan. Israel's first ambassador to Liberia was Ehud Avriel, who was accredited in 1957. On 9 April 1959, Israel made its first agreement with an independent African nation in its treaty of friendship with Liberia. Between 1959 and 1973, Israel and Liberia would make five more agreements. In this same period, Israel would receive one state visit from Liberia in June 1962, when President Tubman visited Jerusalem. Liberia would receive two state visits from Israel, one from President Yitzhak Ben-Zvi to Monrovia in August 1962, and one from Prime Minister Levy Eshkol in June 1966.

Israel helped to contribute to President Tubman's Open Door Policy in the late 1950s. This policy's goal was to bring economic development to Liberia's interior. This involved foreign financial investment, as well as development of its mining and agricultural industries. In the late 1950s, two surveys were conducted by Israeli experts in regard to the agricultural possibilities of Liberia. Private Israeli businesses also provided both large scale construction projects, such as with the Ducor Hotel and a new Executive Mansion, in addition to smaller projects. Israel also helped develop Liberia's medical capabilities.

President William Tubman was a proponent of Israel, and throughout his term in office, he resisted pressure from the Organisation for African Unity (OAU) to oppose Israel. In 1967, after the Six-Day War, Liberia was the first African country to move its embassy in Israel to Jerusalem. It was shown in declassified documents from the Israeli Ministry of Foreign Affairs that diplomatic officials in the Tubman administration, including representatives to the UN, were bribed by Israel in the form of cash and gifts in exchange for diplomatic support.

=== Tolbert administration ===
Upon Tubman's death in 1971, he was succeeded by Vice President William Tolbert. Tolbert was not as supportive of Israel or the Western Bloc as his predecessor. He sought more relations and economic ties with Asian countries, such as the People's Republic of China, and Arab countries. Tolbert also increased Liberian identification with the Non-Aligned Movement. During the OAU summit in Rabat in June 1972, Liberia supported a resolution calling for Israel to withdraw from occupied territories acquired in the Six-Day War. On 2 November 1973, the Tolbert administration severed ties with Israel in response to the Yom Kippur War, along with 28 other African countries. While their formal relations were undone, Liberia maintained some contact with Israel through intermediates, such as private Israeli businesses and international organizations like the United Nations. While Israel–Liberia relations were worsened, Tolbert continued to support the existence of the Israeli state and supported the continuation of Israel's status as a member state of the United Nations.

=== Doe administration ===
On 12 April 1980, Tolbert was killed in a coup d'état led by Samuel Doe, who became Liberian head of state. Initially, leading officials in Doe's regime wanted to preserve a foreign policy more aligned with the Soviet Union and Arab nations. Attempts to renew Israeli-Liberian relations failed in 1982 due to this fact. Israel would end up bribing five officials in the Doe regime in exchange for a renewal of relations.

On 13 August 1983, Doe re-established ties with Israel. Doe visited Israel later in the month, where he supported Israel's policies in the Middle East, and called for the Palestinians to be open to peaceful discussions. Doe was the first African head of state to visit Israel after the large scale revocation of African diplomatic ties with Israel in the early 1970s. After this rekindling of relations, Liberia and Israel established security, technological, and economics ties. In a time when the Doe regime's authoritarian practices made it the target of economic sanctions from the United States Congress, the Reagan administration used Israel as an indirect way to preserve ties between the U.S. and Liberia.

=== Civil war and post-civil war relations ===
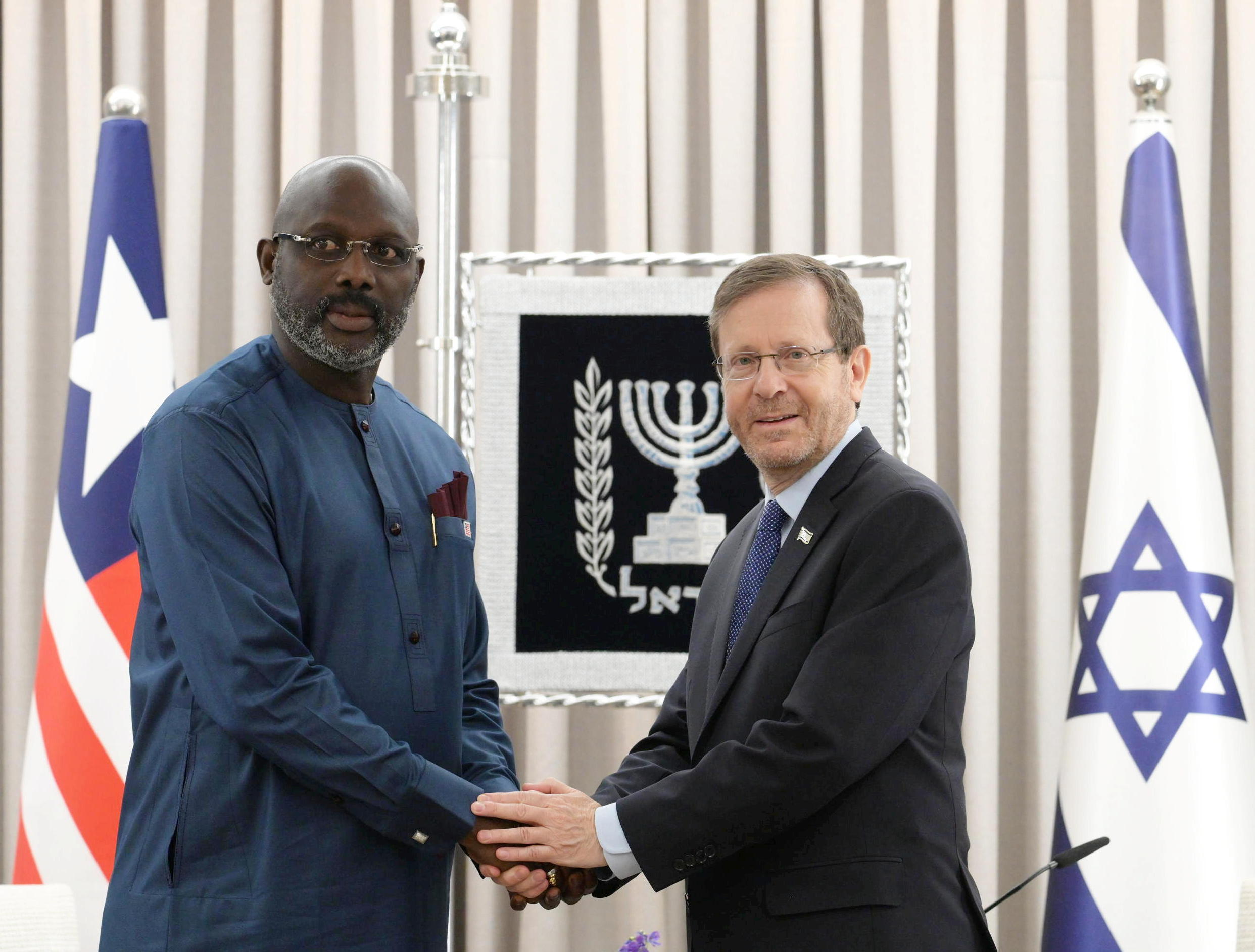
Liberian president George Weah with Israeli president Isaac Herzog in 2023.

The two Liberian civil wars, the first of which started in 1989, and resulted in Doe's execution in 1990 led to another freeze on Liberia's relations with Israel. After the civil wars, the second of which ended in 2003, President Ellen Johnson Sirleaf made a state visit to Israel in 2007. President Sirleaf made another state visit in 2016. In March 2019, President George Weah visited Israel and met with Prime Minister Benjamin Netanyahu. On 8 June 2022, Liberia announced its intention to open a trade mission in Jerusalem which is intended, over time, to become an embassy. Weah visited Israel again in 2023, arriving 3 July, where he met with Netanyahu and President Isaac Herzog. Progress hadn't been made in building Liberia's Jerusalem embassy since the last meeting in 2022. President Herzog said that if the embassy was opened, both trade and bilateral relations would dramatically increase between the two countries.

On 12 December 2023, Liberia voted with Israel and eight other countries in the United Nations General Assembly, opposing a resolution calling for an immediate cease-fire in Gaza amidst the Gaza war. Liberia was in the minority, with 153 member-states voting in favor of the resolution. On 19 December, the Liberian information ministry claimed the Liberian diplomats in the UN voted without the support of President Weah. Weah intervened to change Liberia's vote in the General Assembly to support a ceasefire in Gaza.

As of September 2024, the current ambassador from Israel to Liberia is Roey Gilad, who is also accredited to Ghana and Sierra Leone.

== See also ==
- Foreign relations of Israel
- Foreign relations of Liberia
- List of ambassadors of Israel to Liberia
