= Visa policy of Liberia =

Policy on permits required to enter Liberia

Visitors to Liberia must obtain a visa from one of the Liberian diplomatic missions or apply for an electronic visa on arrival to visit Liberia unless they are citizens from one of the visa-exempt countries. Yellow fever vaccination is required.

== Visa policy map ==
Visa policy of Liberia Liberia Visa not required (90 days) Visa on arrival with QR code (e-VOA) Visa required

== Visa exemption ==
Citizens of the following countries may enter Liberia without a visa for up to 90 days:

- All ECOWAS member states
- Burkina Faso
- Mali
- Niger

Date of visa changes
- 30 April 1980: ECOWAS (Economic Community of West African States): Benin, Burkina Faso, Cape Verde, Gambia, Ghana, Guinea, Guinea-Bissau, Ivory Coast, Liberia, Mali, Niger, Nigeria, Senegal, Sierra Leone, Togo
- 23 September 1982: South Korea

Cancelled:

- 18 July 2019: South Korea

=== Non-ordinary passports ===
Holders of diplomatic and official passports of the following countries may enter Liberia without a visa:

- Economic Community of West African States

- China^{D}
- Kuwait^{D}
- South Africa
- South Korea
- Turkey^{D}
- United Arab Emirates ^{D}
- Vietnam

_{D - Diplomatic passports only.}

== Visa on arrival with QR code (e-VOA) ==
Starting March 11, 2025, international travelers can apply for an electronic visa on arrival to visit Liberia, but if there is a Liberian embassy in one's country, the traveler is required to apply for a visa directly at the embassy and not through this portal.

After submitting all required documents and paying the appropriate fee, travelers are expected to receive a PDF or QR code via email. They can then use this document to board the plane and obtain a visa upon arrival. The expected processing time is three days and a visa on arrival can only be issued at Monrovia international airport.

A visa on arrival may also be issued to travelers starting their journey from a country that has no diplomatic representation of Liberia, provided that the transporting carrier sends a telex message to the station manager in Monrovia. If confirmation is received from the station manager and a copy of the telex confirmation is attached to the ticket, the traveler may board.

== Timatic ==
IATA Timatic lists the following website as the official one for the Liberian eVisa. It is uncleared why this website is promoted, as it is not the official one, which is the following.

== Visa required in advance ==
The following countries hosted Liberian embassies at the time the e-VOA platform was implemented and are therefore required to apply through an embassy:

- Belgium
- Cameroon
- China
- DR Congo
- Egypt
- Ethiopia
- France
- Germany
- Italy
- Japan
- Kuwait
- Morocco
- Qatar
- Saudi Arabia
- South Africa
- United Kingdom
- United States

== See also ==
- Visa requirements for Liberian citizens
