= Mano River =

River in West Africa

Coordinates: 6°55′15″N 11°30′21″W

Mano
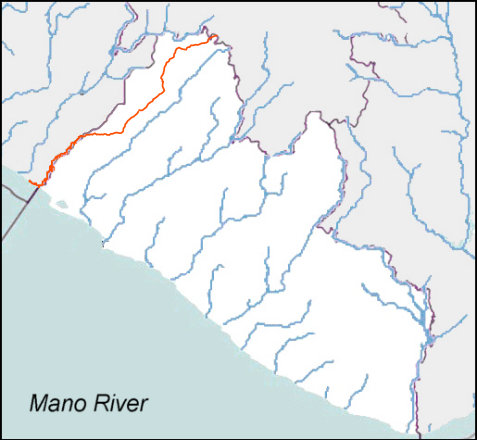
- Mano River

Location
- Countries: Sierra Leone; Liberia

Physical characteristics
- Source
  - location: Guinea Highlands, Sierra Leone
- Mouth
  - location: Atlantic Ocean
- Length: 320 km (200 mi)
- Basin size: 7,634 km^{2} (2,948 sq mi)
- Discharge
  - location: Near mouth
  - average: (Period: 1979–2015) 11.22 km^{3}/a (356 m^{3}/s) (Period: 1971–2000) 369.8 m^{3}/s (13,060 cu ft/s)

Basin features
- River system: Mano River

The Mano River is a river in West Africa. It rises in the Guinea Highlands in Liberia and forms part of the Liberia-Sierra Leone border.

The districts through which the river flows include the Parrot's Beak area of Guinea, Liberia's Lofa County and the Kono and Kailahun District of Sierra Leone. Diamond mining is a major industry in these areas. Control of the area's wealth and the instability of the national governments of all three countries led to a series of violent conflicts involving these districts in the 1990s (See Sierra Leone Civil War, First Liberian Civil War, Second Liberian Civil War).

Liberia and Sierra Leone founded the Mano River Union in 1973. Guinea joined in 1980. It was reactivated in 2004 as a customs and economic union; Côte d'Ivoire joined in 2008.
