= Embassy of Liberia, London =

Embassy of Liberia in London
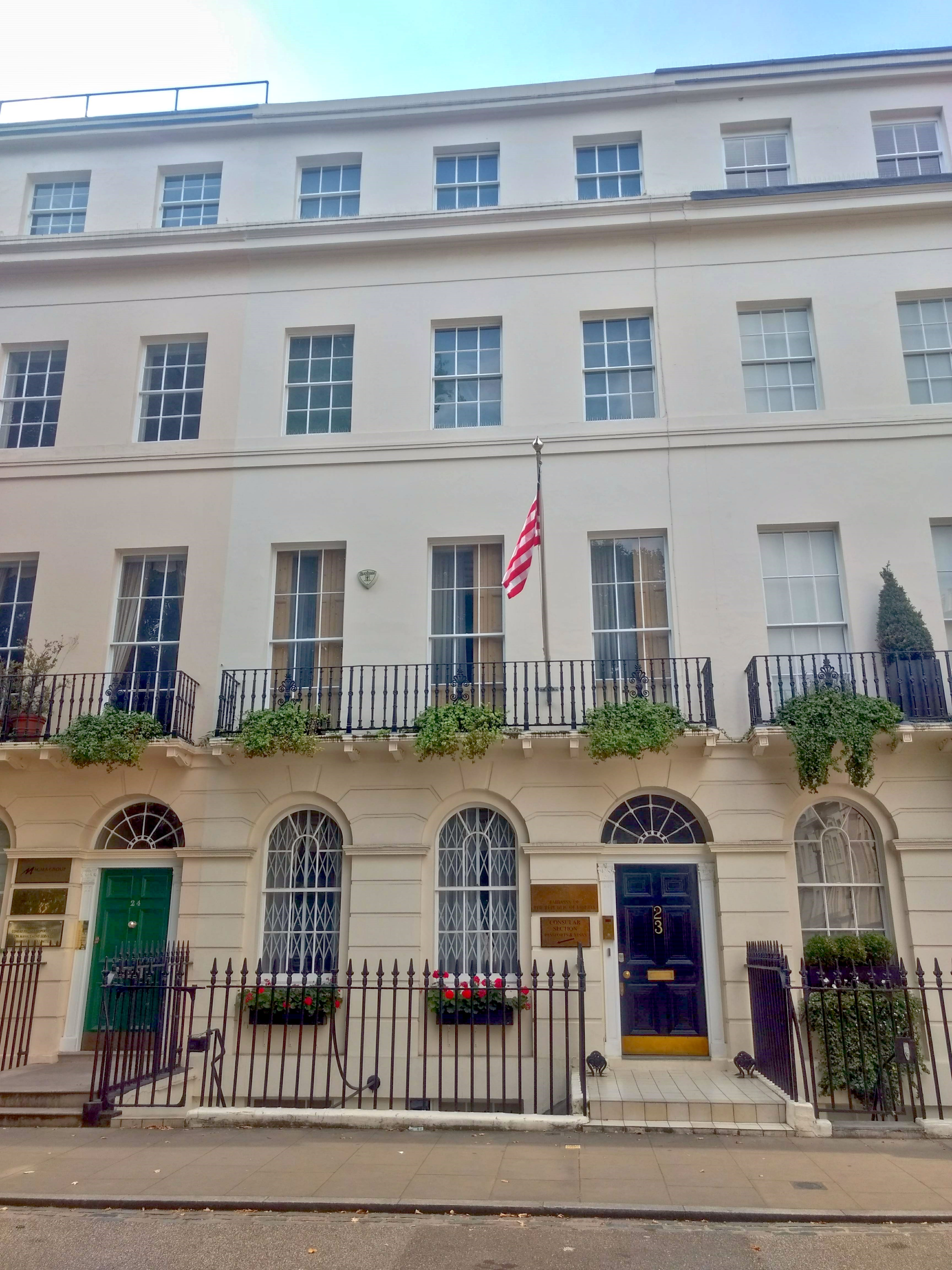
- Location: Fitzrovia, London
- Address: 23 Fitzroy Square, London, W1T 6EW
- Coordinates: 51°31′22.4″N 0°8′26.8″W
- Ambassador: H.E. Genevieve A. Kennedy

The Embassy of Liberia in London is the diplomatic mission of Liberia in the United Kingdom. It is currently located next to the embassies of Mozambique and Croatia on Fitzroy Square.

Liberia is currently represented in the UK by H.E. Genevieve A. Kennedy.

== History ==
Until 1986, the Embassy of Liberia was located at 21 Prince's Gate, and from 1986 until the 2000s, at 2 Pembridge Place in Notting Hill.

In 2007, the UK government expelled two Liberian diplomats serving at the Embassy of Liberia in London.

== Gallery ==
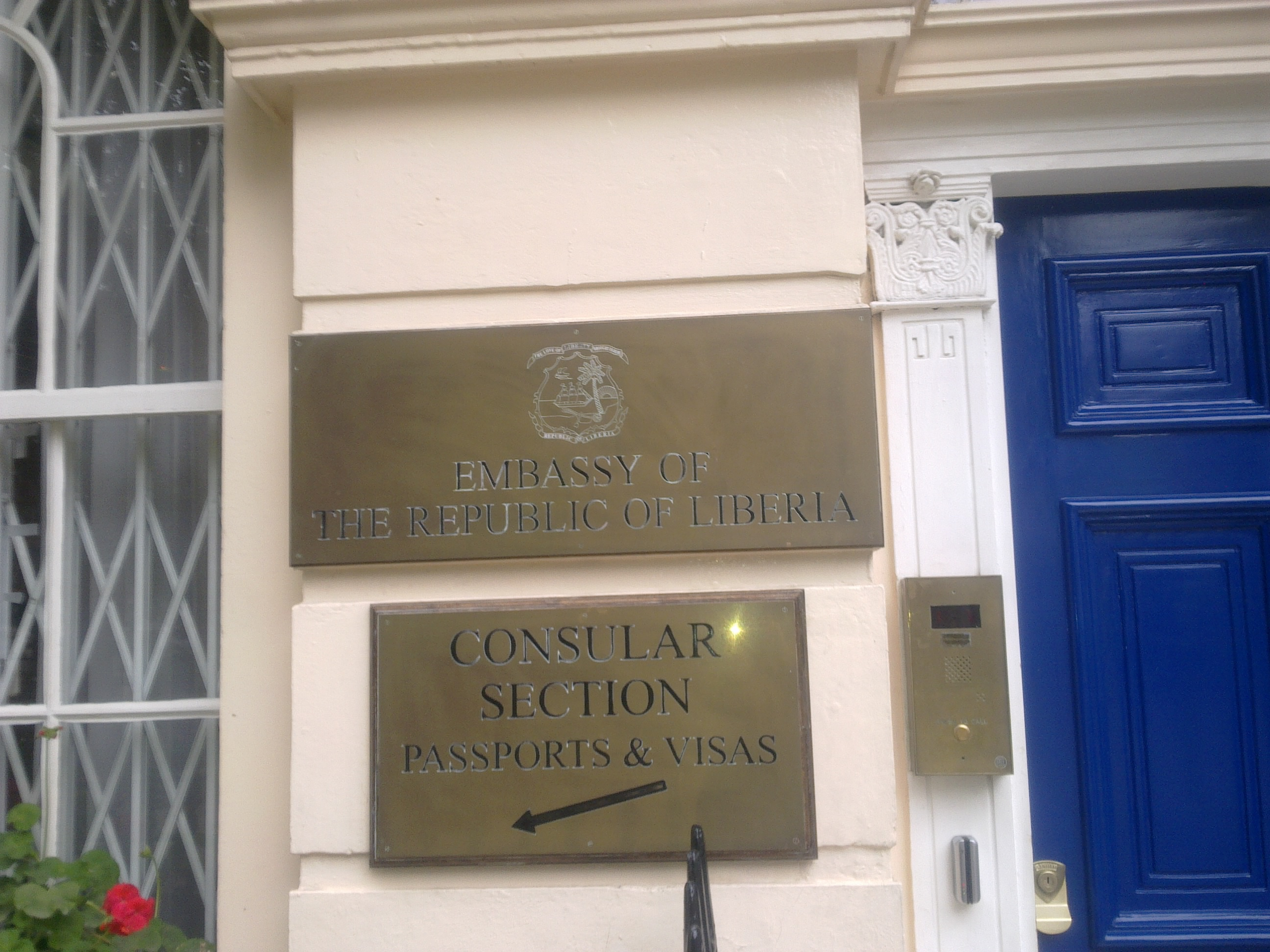
Plaque outside the embassy depicting the Coat of arms of Liberia

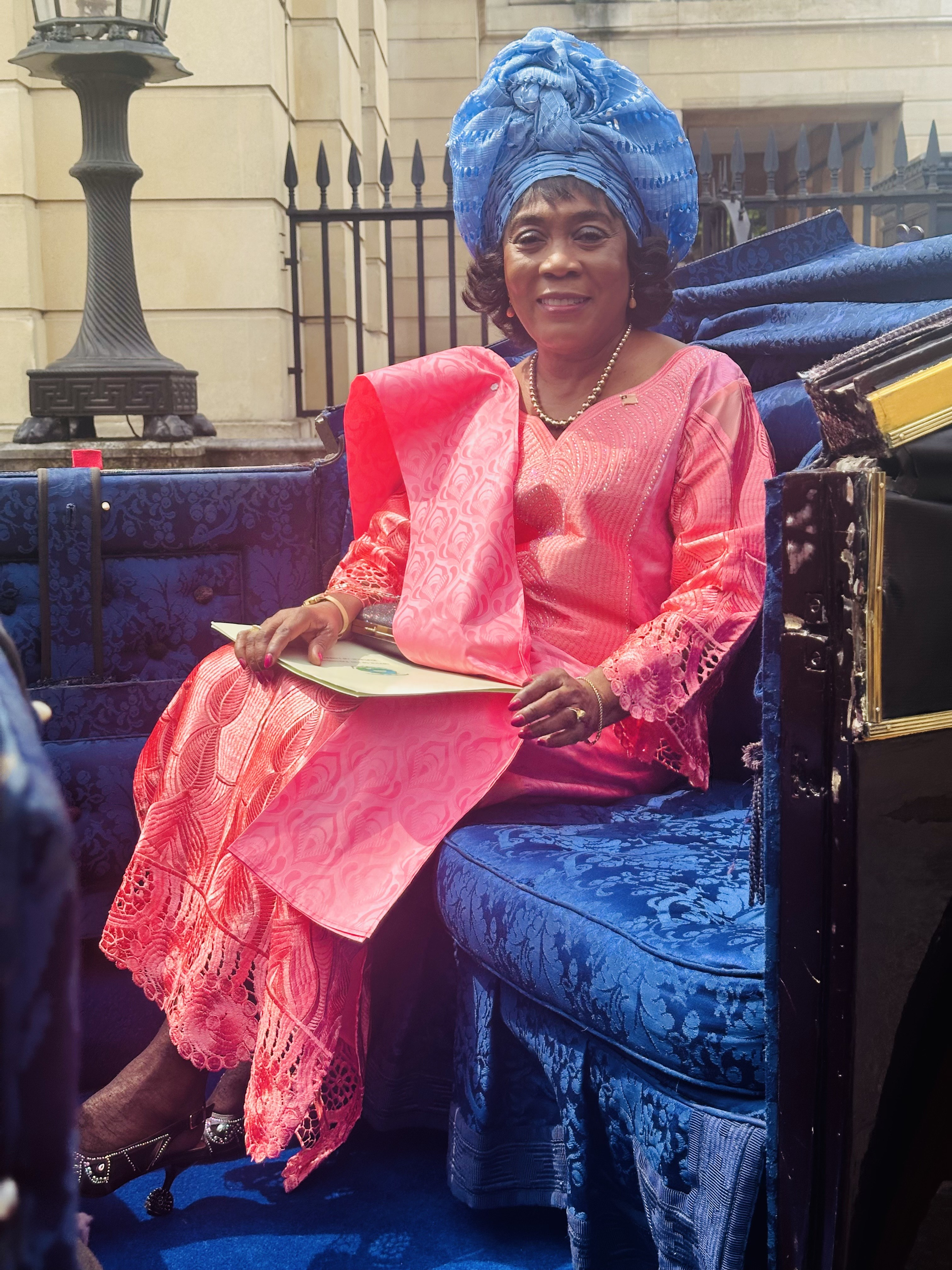
Picture of H.E. Genevieve A. Kennedy (Ambassador of Liberia to the UK) carried in a Berlin carriage
