= Timeline of Monrovia =

The following is a timeline of the history of the city of Monrovia, Liberia.

== 19th century ==
- 1822
  - April: Settlement of Christopolis established by the American Colonization Society in Pepper Coast area.
  - Providence Baptist Church founded.
- 1824 - Settlement renamed "Monrovia" named after United States president James Monroe.
- 1826 - Liberia Herald newspaper begins publication.
- 1839 - Monrovia Seminary founded.
- 1847
  - June 25: Constitutional Convention held in Monrovia to discuss creation of the state of Liberia.
  - July 26: Monrovia becomes part of newly formed Republic of Liberia.
  - October 5: First Liberian general election held.
  - Monrovia becomes seat of newly formed Montserrado County.
- 1853 - Photographer Augustus Washington in business.
- 1862 - Supreme Court building constructed.
- 1863
  - Liberia College opens.
  - Trinity Church consecrated.
- 1867 - Masonic Order of Liberia organized in Monrovia.
- 1872 - January 1: Inauguration of Liberian president Joseph Roberts (second term).
- 1890s - Masonic Temple (Monrovia) built.
- 1892 - Arthur Barclay becomes mayor.

== 20th century ==
- 1904 - College of West Africa active.
- 1918 - German bombing of Monrovia.
- 1920 - Population: 6,000 (estimate).
- 1940s - West Point settlement formed.
- 1940 - Population: 12,000.
- 1943 - Invincible Eleven football club formed.
- 1945 - Gbarnga-Monrovia highway constructed.
- 1947 - Centennial Pavilion erected.
- 1948 - Freeport of Monrovia begins operating on nearby Bushrod Island.
- 1951
  - Liberia Chamber of Commerce headquartered in city.
  - University of Liberia active.
- 1954
  - University's Louis Arthur Grimes School of Law opens.
  - Monrovia Elementary School built.^{(de)}
- 1956 - Nathan C. Ross becomes mayor.
- 1958 - Capitol building constructed.
- 1960 - Ducor Hotel in business.
- 1961 - September: Labor strike held.
- 1962
  - Liberian National Museum established on Providence Island.
  - Population: 80,992.
- 1964
  - Executive Mansion (presidential residence) built.
  - National Cultural Centre created in nearby Kendeja, Paynesville.
- 1965 - Temple of Justice built.
- 1970s - Saint Paul Bridge (Monrovia) built over Saint Paul River.
- 1970 - Population: 96,226.
- 1971 - John F. Kennedy Medical Center opens.
- 1974 - Seat of Montserrado County moved from Monrovia to Bensonville.
- 1976 - People's Bridge built over Mesurado River.
- 1977 - Liberian Center for National Documents and Records headquartered in Monrovia.
- 1979
  - July: Organisation of African Unity meeting held at Hotel Africa in nearby Virginia.
  - "Civil unrest."
- 1980
  - April 12: 1980 Liberian coup d'état; president Tolbert assassinated in the Presidential Palace. Subsequent unrest occurs.
  - Monrovia Black Star FC (football club) formed.
- 1981 - Liberian Observer newspaper begins publication.
- 1984 - Population: 421,053.
- 1986 - Samuel Kanyon Doe Sports Complex opens.
- 1990
  - May 13: Barclay Training Center besieged on Capitol Hill during the First Liberian Civil War.
  - July: Independent National Patriotic Front of Liberia "seized control in part of the capital."
  - July: Massacre at St. Peter's Lutheran church in Sinkor.
  - August 24: Peacekeeping forces of Economic Community of West African States Monitoring Group begin operating.
  - September 9: Assassination of president Doe.
- 1997 - STAR radio begins broadcasting.
- 1998 - 1998 Monrovia clashes.
- 1999 - Red Cross Monument (Monrovia) erected on Broad Street.
- 2000 - Daily Talk news chalkboard launched.

== 21st century ==
- 2001 - Ophelia Hoff Saytumah becomes mayor.
- 2003
  - April: Women of Liberia Mass Action for Peace begins demonstrating.
  - July 18–August 14: Siege of Monrovia occurs during the Second Liberian Civil War.
- 2004 - October: "Riots in Monrovia."
- 2006 - July: Government "switches on generator-powered street lights in the capital, which has been without electricity for 15 years."
- 2008 - Population: 970,824 urban agglomeration.
- 2009 - Mary Broh becomes mayor.
- 2011 - Zolu-Duma-Bridge built.
- 2012 - Coconut Plantation settlement razed.
- 2013 - Henry Reed Cooper becomes mayor.
- 2014
  - Ebola virus epidemic in Liberia occurs.
  - Clara Doe-Mvogo becomes mayor.
- 2015 - George M. Weah becomes Senator of Montserrado County.
- 2017 - George M. Weah elected president.
- 2018 - First Presidential transition occurred since 1944.

== See also ==
- Monrovia history
- List of mayors of Monrovia
- History of Liberia

== Bibliography ==
- Johann Büttikofer (2013) [1890]. "Monrovia". In Henk Dop; Phillip Robinson (eds.). Travel Sketches from Liberia: Johann Büttikofer's 19th Century Rainforest Explorations in West Africa. Brill. pp. 35–54. ISBN 978-90-04-23630-1. (written in 1870s-1880s). 1890 German edition
- Merran Fraenkel (1964). Tribe and Class in Monrovia. London. OCLC 3061240.
- Paul Tiyambe Zeleza; Dickson Eyoh, eds. (2003). "Monrovia, Liberia". Encyclopedia of Twentieth-Century African History. Routledge. ISBN 0415234794.
- Kevin Shillington, ed. (2005). "Monrovia". Encyclopedia of African History. Fitzroy Dearborn. ISBN 978-1-57958-245-6.
- Danny Hoffman (2007). "City as Barracks: Freetown, Monrovia, and the Organization of Violence in Postcolonial African Cities". Cultural Anthropology. 22 (3): 400–428. doi:10.1525/can.2007.22.3.400. JSTOR 4497779.
- Urcun Aude; et al. (2010). "Gouvernance 'non souveraine' et régulation des services de l'eau à Monrovia (Liberia)". Revue Tiers Monde (in French). 203 (203): 159. doi:10.3917/rtm.203.0159 – via Cairn.info.
- Kwame Anthony Appiah; Henry Louis Gates, eds. (2010). "Monrovia". Encyclopedia of Africa. Oxford University Press. ISBN 9780195337709.
