= Mary Broh =

Liberian politician

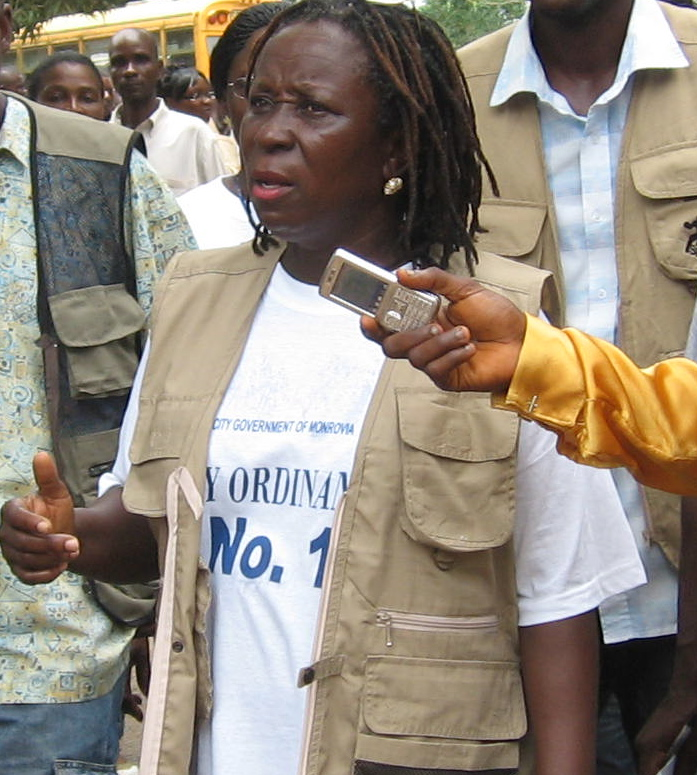
- Mary Broh in Monrovia during an interview near the Executive Mansion (2009)
- Born: 1951 (age 74–75)

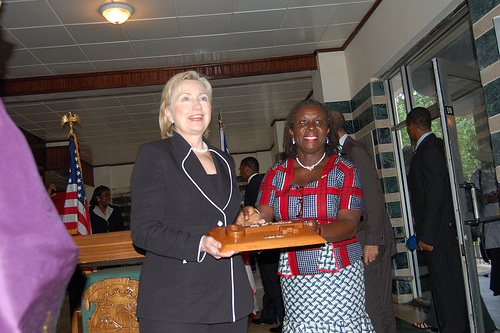
Sec. Clinton accepts a key to the City from Mary Broh (August 21, 2009)

Mary Tanyonoh Broh (born in 1951) is the former mayor of Monrovia, the capital city of Liberia. She first served the Liberian government in March 2006 as the Special Projects Coordinator for President Ellen Johnson Sirleaf's executive staff. In 2007, she was promoted to direct the Passport Bureau in a successful attempt to curtail and eliminate corruption and bribery within the division. In 2008, Broh became the Deputy Director of the National Port Authority. In February 2009, she was selected to serve as Acting Mayor of Monrovia in place of the previous mayor, Ophelia Hoff Saytumah, in the President's effort to legitimize the Monrovia City Corporation's (MCC) administrative and financial management. Although Broh was seated in February 2009 by appointment, rather than by the usual democratic election process, she was not officially confirmed by the Liberian Senate.

Broh has worked to clean up the capital city with measures that include citywide litter reduction campaigns aimed to increase public awareness of litter, sanitation, and overall public health. In October 2009, she implemented the revised City Ordinance No. 1, originally established by the MCC in 1975 to address public health, sanitation, and street vendors. The revision sought to address issues that have accumulated in the capital over the last two decades such as overflowing and unsanitary trash, makeshift structures and unregulated street vendors who sell foodstuffs to locals and tourists alike. She has also worked closely with government officials to address squatting, political corruption, and overpopulation, mainly caused by internally displaced persons that flocked to Monrovia from the hinterland during the civil wars that erupted in the 1980s and 1990s under Samuel Doe and Charles Taylor.

== Initiatives ==
Not long after her appointment as Acting Mayor of Monrovia by President Ellen Johnson-Sirleaf, Mary Broh struggled to gain the confidence of the Legislature as her prolonged "acting" status was called into question on several occasions. Mary Broh's efforts to clean and improve the capital's landscape through task force initiatives rankled various elements of the community. In September 2009, Muslim residents in Monrovia expressed concern over the Special Presidential Task Force to clean the city streets after an incident at the Benson Street mosque created an inconvenience for worshipers during the Muslim holy month of Ramadan.

Despite remarkable progress in a short period of time, the Special Presidential Task Force was dissolved to make way for the Monrovia City Corporation to execute such duties. The Monrovia City Corporation, the governing body of Greater Monrovia District through which the mayor's office enacts, employs and oversees execution of municipal functions, laws and ordinances, vastly rehabilitated formalized waste management and public health initiatives since 2009 under Mary Broh's leadership. Her commitment to transparency and environmental consciousness garnered the support of the World Bank, the Bill and Melinda Gates Foundation and several other international aid organizations. Mary Broh's controversial methods of creating a cleaner, safer Monrovia drew fans and critics alike from all walks of life in Liberia. Her hardline tactics even spawned popular tee-shirts with the caption "Don't Raze Me Broh," a salutatory nod to her zoning and ordinance-enforcing campaign throughout the capital.

More progress came to Monrovia in 2010 when Mary Broh enlisted her staff at the MCC to clean polluted beaches, install portable toilets, and demolish dilapidated buildings left abandoned and bullet-ridden after the 14-year civil war. However, these efforts created a rift in public perception in Liberia and abroad: many found the acting mayor's tactics heavy-handed and lacking empathy for poor and working-class populations of Monrovia.

Mary Broh's anti-corruption and transparency initiatives in the capital focused the spotlight on Liberian companies that often benefited from their connections to government officials. Mary Broh was accused of steering contracts and business away from "corrupt" Liberian contractors, many of which lobbied the World Bank and the Executive Branch to intervene.

A hallmark of Mary Broh's tenure as mayor is the re-enactment of City Ordinance Number One, originally passed in 1975 under the Tolbert administration and revised in 1988 under the Doe administration. The MCC under Mary Broh revitalized the ordinance in an effort to enforce environmental standards for cleanliness and public health while allocating almost 30% of World Bank funds dedicated to Monrovia's waste management issue.

== Controversy and resignation ==
Controversy followed Mary Broh throughout her tenure and came to the forefront in 2011 and 2012; media reports focused on Mary Broh's destruction of public market places, physical altercations with Senate staff members and heated verbal exchanges with legislators and journalists. In February 2013, Mary Broh came to the aid of another embattled public official, Grace Kpaan, Montserrado County Superintendent, whom security officials apprehended as a result of bribery allegations she made against Representative Edward Forh (CDC-district #16 Montserrado County). Mary Broh was cited with obstruction of justice when she intervened in Grace Kpaan's arrest and both were suspended by President Ellen Johnson-Sirleaf. Intense public opinion and collateral damage from previous legislative clashes created a difficult position for President Ellen Johnson-Sirleaf, who was away on government business when this situation developed. Mary Broh submitted her resignation to President Ellen Johnson Sirleaf, effective February 28, 2013. Among a number of noteworthy statements issued in defense of Mary Broh and her impact on Monrovia, Ms. Deborah R. Malac, US Ambassador to Liberia, weighed in on what she perceived as the culmination of gender politics and an atmosphere of sexist hostility and violence towards women.

== Omega Village Project ==
On March 5, 2013, President Ellen Johnson-Sirleaf tapped Mary Broh to head the Project Implementation Unit of the Omega Village Project. In coordination with the Ministry of Public Works, the Liberian governmental lead on the project, Mary Broh will manage the multimillion-dollar development project for a large-scale community with residential housing, retail and municipal services. Alpha Kappa Alpha Sorority donated $500,000 in seed money to launch the Omega Village Project.

== Renomination ==
In early July 2013, media outlets announced that President Ellen Johnson-Sirleaf reappointed several mayors to their posts, Mary Broh being chief among these appointments. Shortly after Mary Broh's controversial and highly publicized resignation from City Hall, reports began to surface about the declining state of sanitation and cleanliness in the capital. Members of the 53rd Liberian Legislature, some of which demanded Mary Broh's resignation in late February 2013, acknowledged the unsanitary conditions in the capital by calling upon the acting mayor, Henry Reed Cooper, to give account for the conditions in the city. Mary Broh's reappointment as Acting City Mayor remains contingent upon confirmation by the 53rd Liberian Legislature, the same body that blocked her confirmation and submitted a vote of "no confidence" in July 2012.

== See also ==
- Timeline of Monrovia

Political offices
Preceded by Ophelia Hoff Saytumah	Mayor of Monrovia, Liberia; February 2009–February 2013, July 2013	Succeeded by Henry Reed Cooper (March 2013-July 2013)
