= Montserrado County =

County in Liberia

- County
- Flag

- Location in Liberia
- Coordinates: 6°30′N 10°30′W
- Country: Liberia
- Capital: Bensonville
- Established: 1847

Government
  - Superintendent: Florence Freemam-Brandy

Area
  - Total: 1,912.7 km^{2} (738.5 sq mi)

Population (2022 census)
  - Total: 1,920,914
  - Density: 1,004.3/km^{2} (2,601.1/sq mi)
- Time zone: UTC+0 (GMT)
- ISO 3166 code: LR-MO
- HDI (2018): 0.534 low · 1st of 15

Montserrado County is a county in the northwestern portion of the West African nation of Liberia containing its national capital, Monrovia. One of 15 counties that comprise the first-level of administrative division in the nation, it has 17 sub political districts. As of the 2022 Census, it had a population of 1,920,914, making it the most populous county in Liberia. The area of the county measures 738.5 square miles (1,913 km^{2}), the smallest in the country. Bensonville serves as the capital.

Created in 1847 at the foundation of the Liberian republic, the county is the oldest in Liberia. Previously, it had been the site of the colony of Kentucky in Liberia. Montserrado’s County Superintendent is Nyenekon Beauty Snoh-Barcon. The county is bordered by Bomi County to the west, Bong County to the north, and Margibi County to the east. The southern part of Montserrado lies on the Atlantic Coast.

== Geography ==
Located on the coast in the northwestern third of Liberia, Montserrado County is bordered by three counties. The Atlantic Ocean makes up the county’s southern border, while Bomi County lies on the western border. Bong County is to the north and Margibi County to the east. The land is mainly alluvial soils, primarily clay, washed seaward from the streams and rivers of the interior valleys. In the lowlands on the coast grow palm trees, mangrove woods, and savanna grasslands with tropical forest covering the interior hills and valleys. Rivers include the St. Paul, Mesurado, Du, and Po.

The climate is tropical with dry and wet seasons. Annual precipitation measures approximately 75 inches (190 cm). From May to November is the rainy season, followed by the dry season from December through April. During the dry season winds from the Sahara Desert called the Harmattan create wild temperature fluctuations from December to the beginning of March.

=== Districts ===
Careysburg District and Todee District are the two statutorily created districts in the county. Commonwealth District, Greater Monrovia District and St. Paul River District are also recognized, but are not officially recognized as administrative districts. There are 21 townships, seven cities, one borough, and two chiefdoms contained within these districts. Administration varies by subunit with a governor running the borough, mayors in charge of cities, commissioners administering townships, and superintendents controlling districts.

Commonwealth's population is 11,876.

Careysburg’s population is 29,712. The main ethnic groups are Kpelle, Bassa, Mano, Kissi, Loma, and Gola. Both the White Plains Water Treatment Plant and the Mount Coffee Hydropower Project are in the district.

Todee District’s population is 33,998 with farming the primary economic activity. The district is run by chiefdoms and clan systems, as the county contains a large number of native African communities.

The most populous district in the county and the nation, Greater Monrovia District, is home to 970,824 people. Employment is mainly informal, small-scale trade and government employment through the national government or foreign governments. The population has members of each of Liberia’s 16 main tribes.

St. Paul River District is the second most populous district in the county with 71,831 residents. Residents are primarily Christians and a member of the Bassa, Dey, or Kpelle tribes. Farming and fishing are the main economic activities along with some small-scale trading. The district has one paved road.

== Demographics ==
Montserrado is the smallest county by size, but largest by population comprising approximately 33% of Liberia’s total population. The population density is 599.7 inhabitants per square kilometre (1,553/sq mi), the highest in Liberia. The county had a population of 491,078 at the 1984 Census. The average household size was 4.7 people, a decrease from 5.4 at the 1984 Census. The county capital of Bensonville has a population of 4,089.

Males outnumber females in the county with 585,833 to 558,973. Christians compose an estimated 68.2% of the population, with Muslims totaling 31.8%. All of Liberia’s 16 main tribal groups are represented in the ethnic make up of the county. Kpelle speaking groups represent 52% of the population while Bassa speakers comprise 21%, followed by Lorma with 6%, Kru with 4%, and all others with 3% or less each.

In the county 10% of the population was considered food insecure, with 35% listed as highly vulnerable, 43% as moderately vulnerable, and 13% were listed as food secure regarding access to sustenance as of October 2006. Residents lived mainly in owner occupied dwellings, which made up 61% of households. Seventeen percent rented their homes with an average cost of 341 LD, and 22% lived rent free in their home.

== Government ==
Each county in Liberia is headed by a superintendent appointed by the Liberian President. Montserrado’s county superintendent is Beauty Barcon. Other executive office include commissioners for districts and townships, line ministries, and an assistant superintendent that focuses on development. The county is divided into five districts, seven cities, one borough, twenty-one townships, seven clans, and two chiefdoms. A district superintendent heads each of the two statutory districts.

Judicially, the county has eight total courts between probate, justice of the peace, and magisterial courts. The Liberian National Police have 844 officers spread across 33 stations in the county, as of October 2007. Additionally, the National Police Training Academy is in Montserrado County in Paynesville City. Other national government employees assigned to the county include tax collectors, revenue agents, and customs officials.

=== Flag ===
County flag

The county flag contains green, brown, blue, and red. Half is red and half is blue, split along a diagonal line running from the lower left-hand corner to the upper right-hand corner. Blue comprises the top half and symbolizes that Montserrado was the first county. Red is on the bottom and represents the bloodshed from wars between tribal members and the African-American settlers. In the center lies a circle with trees which celebrate agriculture and the soil. There is a small Liberian flag in the upper left corner.

== Economy ==
The county contains the most and the largest markets in the entire country. One of these is the Red Light market in Paynesville where a variety of consumer goods are sold out of wheelbarrows and old intermodal containers. Markets include daily markets, primarily for food, and weekly markets. The Red Light market and the Duala markets serve as distribution markets for incoming goods from the rural parts of Liberia.

Due to a lack of formal employment, many engage in informal businesses and trading. As of October 2006, employment in the county is primarily self-employment with only 17% of households having members that were salaried employees. The largest income generation activity was through petty trade or small business, with 46% of households engaged in these activities. This was followed by 25% for making charcoal, 19% for temporary employment, and 18% for palm oil/nut production and sales. The national government is the county's single largest employer.

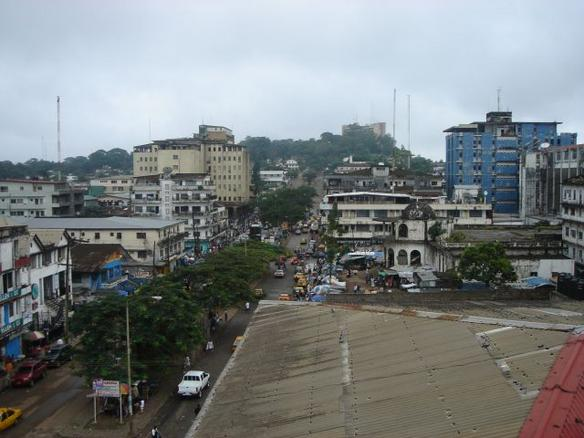
Cityscape of Monrovia

Agriculture is a small part of the economy, with the main crops consisting of cassava (90% of all crops), rice (16%), other vegetables (18%), corn (16%), sweet potatoes or eddoes (8%), plantain or bananas (8%), and pulses (1%). Livestock is mainly pigs, chickens, and ducks. Commercial crops grown include cocoa, coconuts, sugarcane, pineapple, kola nuts, palm oil, and rubber. Some palm oil is produced on government-owned farms in Mt. Coffee and Fendell.

Rubber plantations are located in the Todee and Careysburg districts. These include the Morris American Rubber Company in Todee which employs 600 and the Liberia Resources Corporation in Careysburg with 300 employees. Overall rubber production accounts for eight percent of household income in Montserrado County. Small scale mineral extraction occurs for gold and diamonds. Other resource extraction activities include logging and fishing.

The Central Bank of Liberia is located in Monrovia, with other commercial banks also operating in Montserrado County, including the International Bank. The main port is the Freeport of Monrovia, the country's busiest port. The port has one wharf and four piers, though one pier cannot be used due to a sunken ship. Air travel available at Spriggs Payne Airport in Monrovia and Roberts International Airport in Robertsfield. Roberts is the only international airport in Liberia, and Payne along with Roberts have the only paved runways in the nation. Limited public transportation is available in the capital via the Monrovia Transit Authority. Passenger and freight rail service is available from the private company Geoservices between Monrovia and the Bong mines.

== Education ==
The county had a total of 947 students enrolled in school in 1910. In 1948, the missionaries from the Pentecostal faith opened a school in Mein Clan in Todee District. Additional primary schools were built in the 1970s, while in 1976 the University of Liberia opened the Fendall branch campus in Louisiana. Bentol City added a high school in 1978. The University of Liberia’s main campus is located in Monrovia and includes the country’s only law school in the Louis Arthur Grimes School of Law.

Enrollment in primary schools in the county totaled 314,409 students, which was 35% of the total number for the nation as a whole. Students attended a total of 1,096 schools in the county. Thirty-three percent of county residents had no formal education, while 27% had attended some elementary school. Seven percent completed elementary school, 19% had some high school education, and 11% completed high school. One percent of residents completed college, attended college, or have received a vocational education. Enrollment for school-age children is 70%, with 76% for males and 65% for females.

== Culture ==
The Liberian National Museum is located in Monrovia, while the city also hosts two football stadiums, the National Complex and Antoinette Tubman Stadium. Media include STAR radio, The Daily Talk news boards, and The Analyst newspaper.

The majority of the county’s population is Christian. with the Roman Catholic Archdiocese of Monrovia serving as the head of the Catholic Church.

== Infrastructure ==
The Liberia Water and Sewer Corporation provides water to some parts of the county. Prior to the civil wars it used water from the Mount Coffee Hydropower Project to supply water and some sewage disposal. There are approximately 13,000 wells in the county and 518 hand pumps. In health care, the county has eight hospitals, nine health centers, and approximately 93 medical clinics functioning as of 2008. Montserrado County has limited access to electricity, with the majority of power being generated by privately owned generators. The county is not served by any public communications, though cellular communications are available through four private companies. Ashmun Street is the main street in Monrovia, while the People’s Bridge crosses the Mesurado River.

== History ==
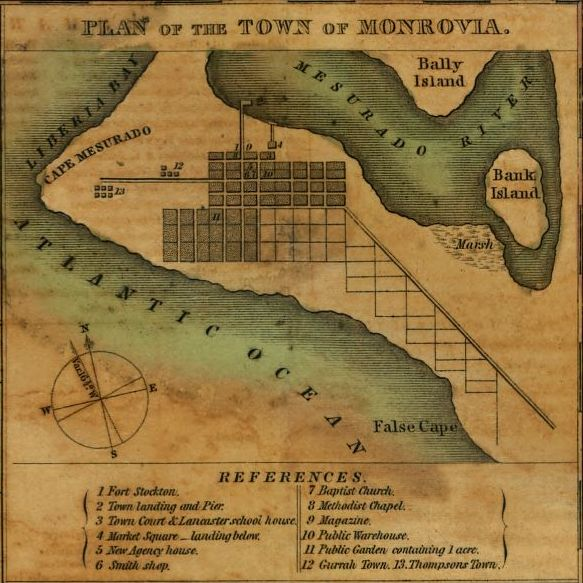
Early plan for Monrovia

On December 11, 1821, officials from the United States arrived aboard the vessel Alligator under the command of Captain Robert F. Stockton at Mesurado Bay. Stockton and Dr. Eli Ayers negotiated to acquire the land in and around the bay from the native chiefs for a settlement by free people of color before sailing to Sierra Leone to pick up these colonists.

On January 7, 1822, free people of color arrived and settled on Providence Island on the Mesurado River under the auspices of the American Colonization Society (ACS), and by April they had moved to the mainland. A Kentucky state affiliate of the ACS was formed in 1828, and members raised money to transport Kentucky blacks—freeborn volunteers as well as slaves set free on the stipulation that they leave the United States—to Africa. The Kentucky society bought a 40-square-mile (100 km^{2}) site along the Saint Paul River and named it Kentucky in Africa. Clay-Ashland was the colony's main town.

Within the next two decades, approximately 3,200 free people of color arrived in the Montserrado County area from Trinidad and Tobago, Saint Vincent and the Grenadines, Saint Kitts and Nevis, Grenada, Saint Lucia, and Jamaica. As opportunities increased, these people moved through Grand Cape Mount, Bomi County, Montserrado, and Margibi County to seek employment and prosperity. Many of the communities in the county are named for the pioneers who settled the area and their former homes in America.

The Liberian Herald began printing in 1830 in Monrovia and was the first newspaper in Liberia. In 1832, the Dey-Golah War erupted between the colonists and the native tribes. There was one battle, with the colonists from Monrovia defeating the Dey and Golah (Gola) combined group. In 1847, the colony declared its independence and Montserrado was the first of the Republic of Liberia's counties to sign the Declaration of Independence on July 26, 1847. At the time of creation, the county was composed of three administrative districts in Bomi, Gibi, and Marshall with Monrovia as the county capital. In 1885, the first municipal water supply system was completed in Monrovia.

The first County Inspector was appointed in 1949 by President Tubman, followed by President Tolbert’s appointment of the first County Superintendent in 1973. A railroad was constructed in the mid-1960s from Monrovia's port to Todee District by the Bong Mining Company. The Mount Coffee Hydropower Project's first phase was completed in 1966. Rubber and palm oil plantations were started in the 1960s and 1970s, while a factory for producing clothing was built in 1979 in Bentol City.

In 1974, the county capital was moved by President Tolbert from Monrovia to his hometown of Bensonville. In 1976, an Assistant Superintendent was added to focus on development in Montserrado County. Bomi Territory in the western portion of the county became Bomi County in 1983. In 1984, Marshall and Gibi territories were combined and became neighboring Margibi County to the east.

Virginia saw the construction of the Unity Conference Center and Hotel Africa in 1979. During the civil strife of the 1980s into the early 2000s much of the county’s infrastructure was looted and left unmaintained. In July 2008, parts of the county received the worst flooding in its recorded history.
