= Dandawailo =

Dixville Township
- Town and suburb
- Location in Liberia
- Coordinates: 6°22′28″N 10°43′19″W
- Country: Liberia
- County: Montserrado County
- District: Greater Monrovia
- Time zone: UTC+0 (GMT)

Dixville is a town and northern suburb of Monrovia, Liberia, to the north of Kaba Town.
