= Mount Coffee Hydropower Project =

Dam in Montserrado County, Liberia

- Interactive map of Mount Coffee Hydropower Project
- Location: White Plains, Montserrado County, Liberia
- Coordinates: 6°30′17″N 10°38′54″W
- Opening date: 1966
- Operator: Liberia Electricity Corporation

Dam and spillways
- Impounds: Saint Paul River

The Mount Coffee Hydropower Project is a hydroelectric project in the West African nation of Liberia on the Saint Paul River. Built in 1966 with additional phases completed later, the project has a maximum generating capacity of 88 MW. The Walter F. Walker Hydro Dam and generating facilities were extensively damaged during the First Liberian Civil War in 1990 and functioning was not restored until 2018.

== History ==
In 1963, the Liberian government received a loan from the World Bank to develop a US$24.3 million hydroelectric project. Construction of the facility began in 1964 by the Monrovia Power Authority using Raymond Concrete Pile Company as the contractor and Stanley Consultants as the project managers. In 1966, the power company completed the initial phase of the dam and began generating electricity. The project was finished in 1967 and named the T. J. R. Faulkner W.F. Walker Hydroelectric Power Station.

Initial generating capacity was 30 MW produced by two turbines, which was increased to 64 MW when two more turbines were added in 1973. The Monrovia Power Authority became the Liberia Electricity Corporation on July 12, 1973. In June 1990, the government announced plans to more than double the electricity generating capacity of the project and adding a reservoir to allow more generation during the dry season. The plans called for a new 4,000 feet (1,200 m) dam to be built upriver on the Vai River to provide storage capacity, while two 52 MW turbines would be added at the existing power generating plant. The US$300 million expansion was never begun due to the Civil War.

In July 1990, rebel forces under the command of Charles Taylor seized the dam and shut off power and water to Monrovia. During this First Civil War, the project's intake dam was destroyed on one end while the rest received other damage. Other parts of the facilities were looted and destroyed in later years of the conflict. Beginning in early 2005, proposals were made to repair the facility and restore power, including a proposal by China.

The United States Trade and Development Agency gave $400,000 to Liberia in February 2007 to study rebuilding and expanding the project. The study showed no structural damage to the dam, but that most of the project's facilities would need to be rebuilt at a cost of US$383 million. As of August 2008, the Liberian government was considering privatization of the project for a fixed number of years as the nation did not have the resources to fund the repair.

In May 2012, the Mt. Coffee Hydropower Rehabilitation Project was initiated with a series of surveying and engineering assessments of the feasibility of revitalizing the plant. This work culminated with the signing of a contract in April 2013 with a Norwegian company (Norplan AS) and a German company (Fichtner GmbH) to revitalize the defunct power-plant by 2015.

In December 2016, the first hydropower turbine and generator unit, with an installed capacity of 22 megawatts (MW), was officially dedicated and commissioned. The project, completed in 2018, raised the total installed capacity of the Mt. Coffee Hydropower Plant to 88 MW (four generating units of 22 MW each). The Mount Coffee Hydroelectric Dam is located in Mount Coffee, township of Harrisburg. White Plains is the site of the water filtration plant.

== Details ==
Located in the Harrisburg Township of Careysburg District, Montserrado County, it lies on the Saint Paul River approximately 21 miles (34 km) from Monrovia. The dam is a run-of the river style dam, in that there is no reservoir. Due to the lack of a reservoir, the dependable generating capacity is only 10 MW, as that is the normal flow of the river during the dry season. Prior to the First Liberian Civil War the plant produced 64MW of electricity, which accounted for 35% of all electricity generated in the nation. In addition to electricity, the Liberia Water and Sewer Corporation used the project to provide drinking water to Monrovia and surrounding areas before the war.
