= List of bridges in Liberia =

An incomplete list of bridges in Liberia.

== Montserrado County ==
- Gabriel Tucker Bridge
- Mesurado Bridge
- Stockton Creek Bridge
- St. Paul's Bridge
- Via Town Bridge

== Elsewhere ==
- George W. Bush Bridge, Grand Kru County
- Sarbo Bridge, River Gee and Maryland counties
- Borlola River Bridge, Margibi County
- Greenville Bridge
