= Nathaniel Varney Massaquoi School =

- West Point Township, Monrovia; Liberia

Information
- Opened: 1972
- Principal: Momoh Mason
- Grades: Elementary and junior high
- Campus size: 1600 students (2012)

The Nathaniel Varney Massaquoi Elementary and Junior High School is a public school within Liberia's Monrovia Consolidated School System, located in the West Point Township. The school was established in 1972, and is named for Nathaniel Varney Massaquoi (1905–1962), a Liberian educator and politician from the Vai community, who rose to become Secretary of Public Instruction. It serves as the only government school for a township of some 80,000 residents. The school received global attention in 2014–2015, when it was attacked during protests amidst the 2014 Ebola crisis, and was then restored, painted with bright murals, and reopened through international efforts.

== Ebola crisis ==
In August 2014, protesters broke into and looted the building, upon discovering that the government had quietly assigned the school to be used as an isolation center for suspected Ebola victims. The Ministry of Education announced a reopening for the school on 16 February 2015, but extensive damage and possible contamination delayed the resumption of schooling; it remained closed after schools were officially ordered reopened on 3 March.

== Restoration ==
In 2015, the building underwent extensive refurbishment, by Liberian and international agencies as well as local volunteers. UNMIL provided a military officer as a project director, the Armed Forces of Liberia provided engineers, and the NGO Department of Children, Families and Humanitarian Services coordinated around 100 volunteers on day and overnight shifts. Further support was provided by Welthungerhilfe, and UNMEER.

== Artwork ==
The building received extensive murals through collaboration between Liberian and American artists. Chattanooga street artist Nanook (David Cogdill) produced a large mural inside the school, while Baltimore artists Jessie Unterhalter and Katey Truhn designed the school's ornamented exterior wall.
