= Monrovia Consolidated School System =

School district in Monrovia, Liberia

Location
- Monrovia; Liberia

District information
- Type: Public, school division
- Grades: K–12
- Established: 1964
- Superintendent: Isaac Saye-Lakpoh Zawolo

Other information
- Website: www.mcssedu.org

The Monrovia Consolidated School System (MCSS) provides primary and secondary education to the population of the Monrovia metropolitan area, Liberia. The MCSS was established by government charter in 1964 under the Act to Amend the Education Law to Create the Monrovia Consolidated School System.

== History ==
Prior to the creation of the MCSS, schools in Monrovia were individually administered by principals reporting directly to the Ministry of Education. A Memorandum of Understanding, the preliminary step to the establishment of the system, was signed on 28 February 1963.

== Schools ==
- Nathaniel Varney Massaquoi School
