= Ashmun Street =

Street in Monrovia, Liberia

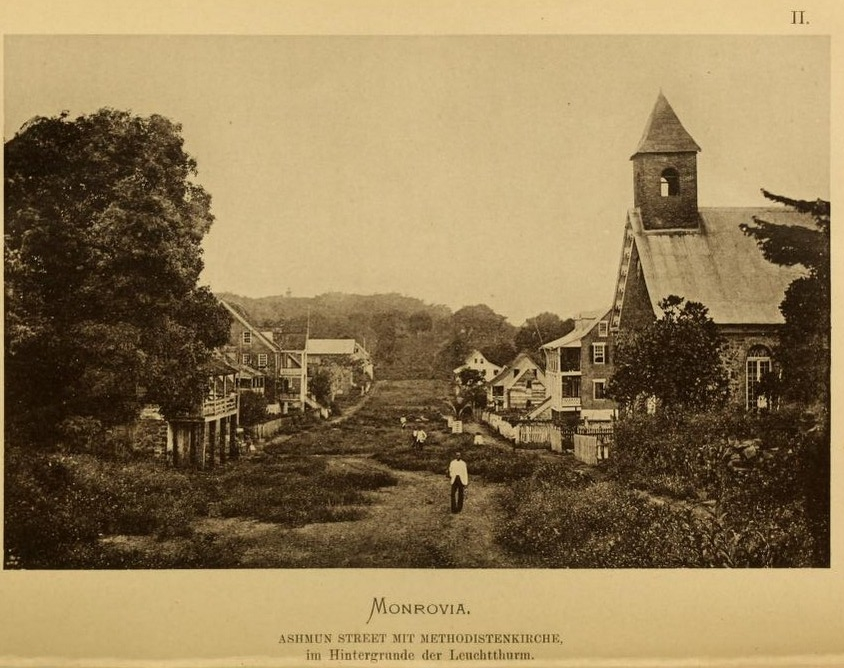
Ashmun Street in Monrovia, 1890

Ashmun Street is a main thoroughfare of Monrovia, Liberia. It crosses the city in a north-west to south-easterly direction in alignment with the coast but several hundred yards away. It houses some of the most important buildings in the city including the Liberian National Museum which was previously the Old Court of Law of Liberia.

== See also ==
- Trans-African Highway network
