= Ophelia Hoff Saytumah =

Liberian politician

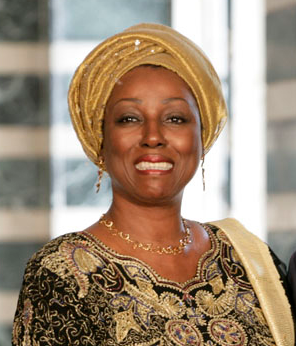
Ophelia Hoff Saytumah

Ophelia Hoff Saytumah is a politician in Liberia. She was the mayor of Liberia's capital city of Monrovia. President Charles Taylor appointed her in 2001 to the position. She used to be the head of Ophelia Travel Agency and has served on the board of directors for Roberts International Airport. After she served as mayor she became a vice president of the Liberia Oil Company.

== See also ==
- Timeline of Monrovia

Political offices
Preceded by	Mayor of Monrovia, Liberia; 2001–2009	Succeeded by Mary Broh
