= Ellen A. Sandimanie =

Liberian city official

- Ellen A. Sandimanie, from a 1961 newspaper.
- Other names: Ellen Ann Brathwaite Sandimanie, Ellen Brathwaite Stryker
- Occupations: City official, ordained minister
- Known for: Mayor-Commissioner of Monrovia, 1970–1973

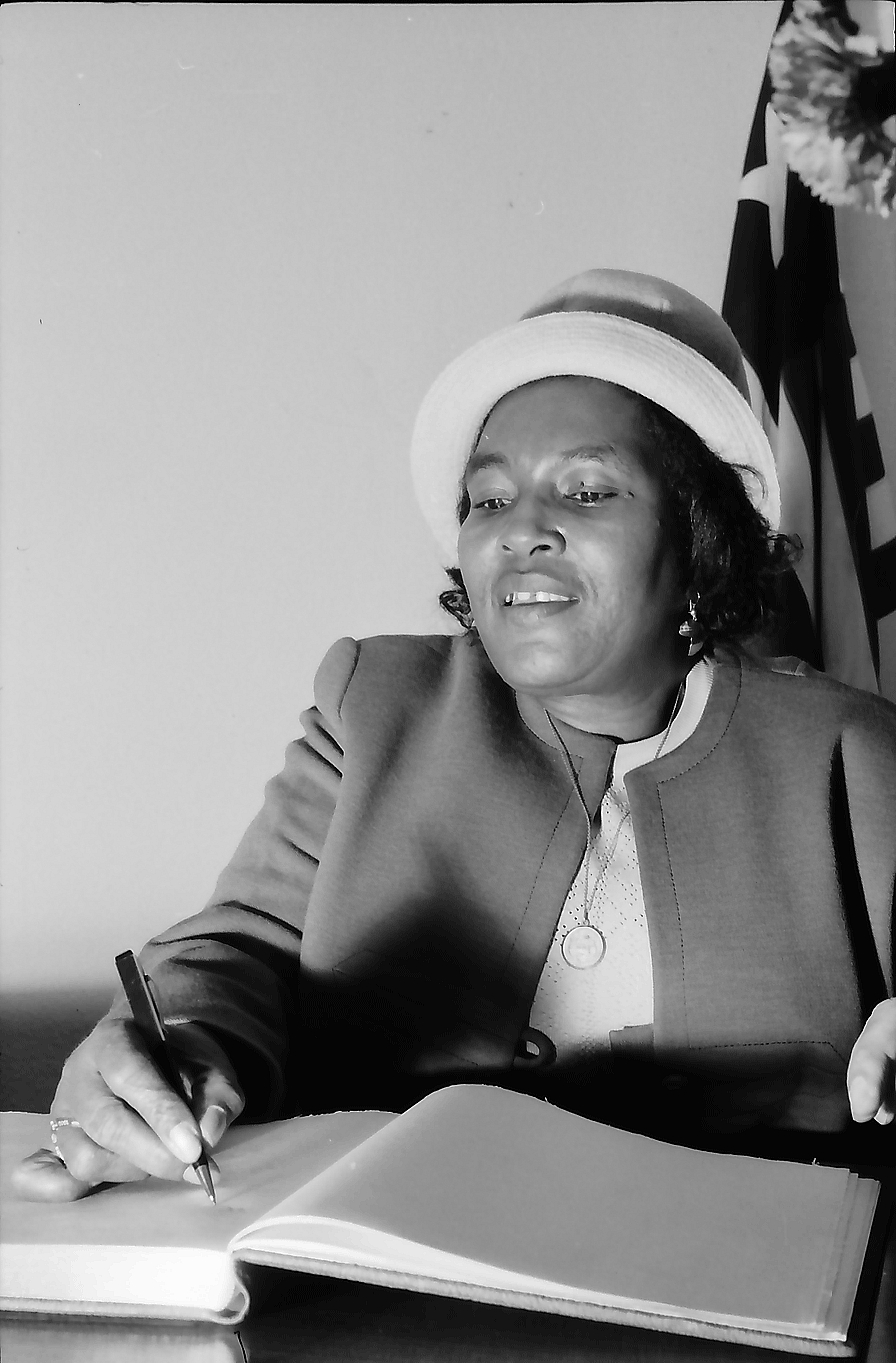
Ellen A. Sandimanie in 1970

Ellen Ann Brathwaite Stryker Sandimanie was a Liberian city official and ordained Presbyterian minister. She was the first woman to serve as the Mayor-Commissioner of Monrovia, holding the position from 1970 to 1973. Sandimanie represented Liberia at international gatherings of Presbyterian women during the 1960s and 1970s.

== Early life ==
Ellen Ann Brathwaite was born in Liberia into a prominent Americo-Liberian family. She graduated from the Liberia College and earned a diploma from the Monrovia Bible Institute.

== Career ==
In 1961, Sandimanie toured the United States for several months, attending the annual General Assembly of the United Presbyterian Church in the U.S.A. in Buffalo, New York, and the triennial meeting of United Presbyterian Women in Lafayette, Indiana. During her tour, she lectured at various churches and women's groups. She also represented Liberian women at international meetings in Brussels and Accra.

In 1966, Sandimanie was ordained as a Presbyterian minister in Liberia, serving two rural churches in Marshall and Fansehn Town. She was also president of the Presbyterian Women of Liberia.

Sandimanie was appointed deputy mayor of Monrovia in 1965. In 1970, President William Tubman appointed her as Mayor-Commissioner of Monrovia. "I realize the job is a challenge to my sex, so I work hard to justify my appointment, to prove women are capable," she stated.

In 1972, she visited the United States again, touring Washington, D.C., Richmond, Virginia, and other cities. During her visit, she received the key to the city of Montclair, New Jersey, and met entertainer Sammy Davis Jr.. Sandimanie embarked on another lecture tour in the United States in 1980.

== Personal life ==
Ellen Ann Brathwaite was married twice. Her first husband was Richard Stryker, a carpenter. Together, they had two sons, Jehu T. Stryker and H. Victor Stryker. After Richard's death, she later married Boymah Y. Sandimanie II, an engineer. In addition to her two biological sons, she also raised eight foster children.
