= Freeport of Monrovia =

- Interactive map of Freeport of Monrovia

Location
- Country: Liberia
- Location: Monrovia; Montserrado County
- Coordinates: 6°20′24″N 10°47′42″W

Details
- Opened: 1948
- Type of harbour: Artificial
- Size of harbour: 750 acres (3.0 km^{2})
- No. of berths: 4
- No. of wharfs: 1
- Warehouse space: 10,000 square metres (110,000 sq ft)

Statistics
- Main imports: Oil, food
- Main exports: Rubber

The Freeport of Monrovia is the main commercial port facility in the West African nation of Liberia. It was artificially created on Bushrod Island near Monrovia in 1948. The facility contains four piers and one main wharf with four berths. The port also has tanker facilities and a fishery pier. The National Port Authority operates it.

== History ==
As early as 1850, seagoing ships began exporting palm oil from a port at Monrovia. During World War II, the United States Armed Forces landed in Liberia to ensure the flow of rubber exports for use in wartime materials. These forces improved the port facilities in Monrovia and built an artificial harbor with two breakwaters. In 1948, this new 750 acres (3.0 km^{2}) bay opened.

The national government took over the port from an American company in 1971 and created the National Port Authority to operate the facility. A strike in 1981 crippled the port for a month before the President of Liberia dismissed the strikers. In 1990, during the First Liberian Civil War, President Samuel Doe was captured at the port by Prince Johnson and later executed elsewhere.

In 1995, the M/V Mush sank after being overloaded and hindered port traffic until removed in 1998. On July 25, 2001, the M/V Torm Alexandra sunk at the port, blocking one of the berths. After years of failed efforts to remove the ship, the ship was raised and removed in a private operation financed by the United States government in May 2009. In 2002, the port authority completed dredging the harbor's entrance to allow for second and third generation vessels to visit.

In 2010, the Liberian government signed a $120 million (~$168 million in 2024) concession agreement with APM Terminals, establishing a public-private partnership between the company and the National Port Authority to run the port. According to the terms of the agreement, APM Terminals will modernize the port and its staff, bringing it in line with international standards.

In October 2012, Western Cluster Limited (WCL) signed a port lease and operating agreement with the management of the National Port Authority (NPA) for the rehabilitation and construction of infrastructures at the Freeport of Monrovia for WCL's export of iron ore. WCL's Mineral Development Agreement signed with the government of Liberia in August 2011 for the development of iron ore mines in Bea, Bomi and Mano River Mines in western Liberia required the company to enter into a Port Lease and Operating Agreement with the NPA for the shipping of its iron ore through the Freeport of Monrovia. The agreement allows WCL to construct loading and unloading facilities including rehabilitation of the former Liberia Mining Company and National Iron Ore Company piers. It earmarks 43.29 acres of land for WCL to develop the port facilities. Apart from the infrastructure development which will be undertaken by WCL, the National Port Authority will be receiving annual lease rental for the land.

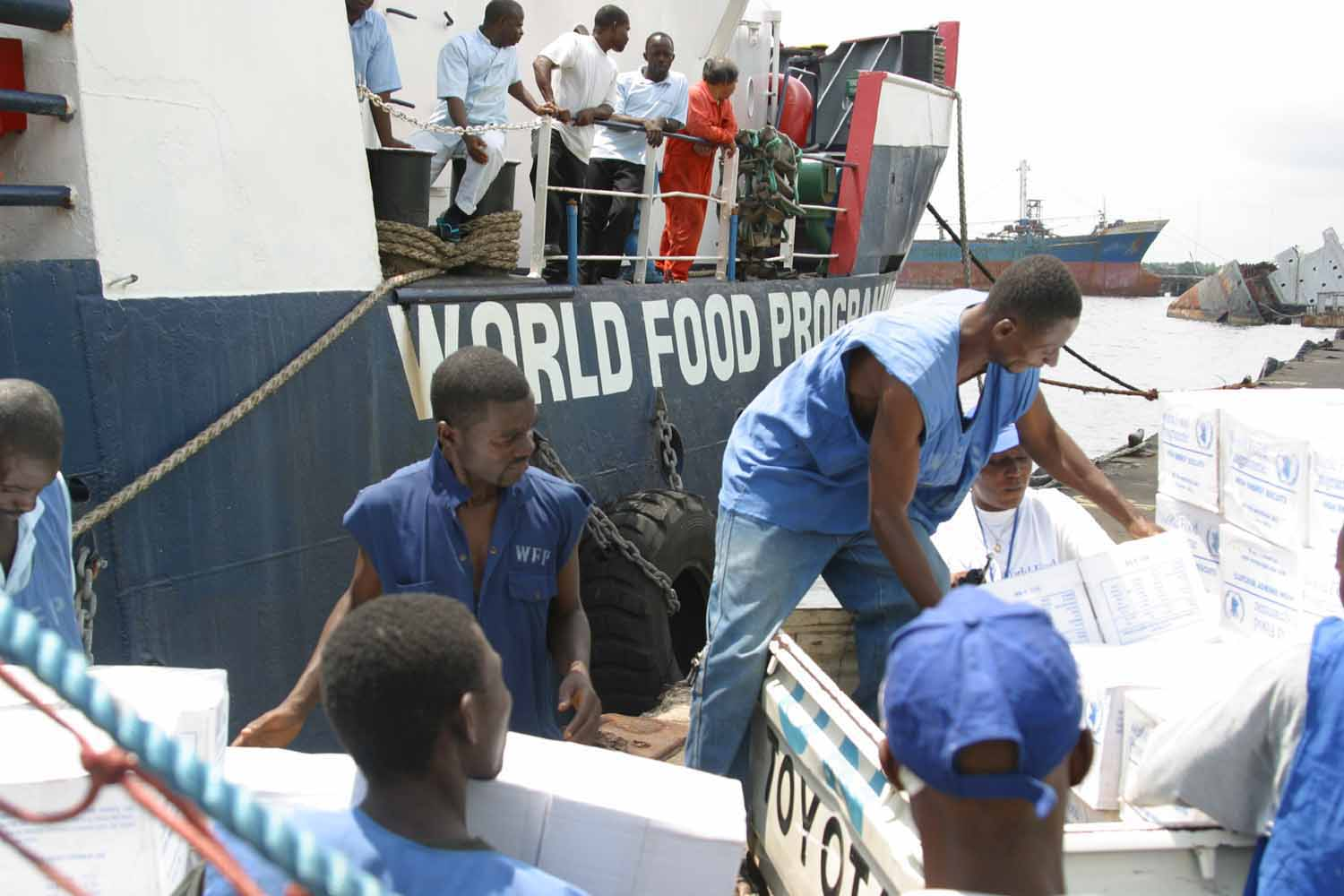
The Martin, a World Food Programme ship unloads pallets of high energy biscuits at the Freeport of Monrovia on August 15, 2003

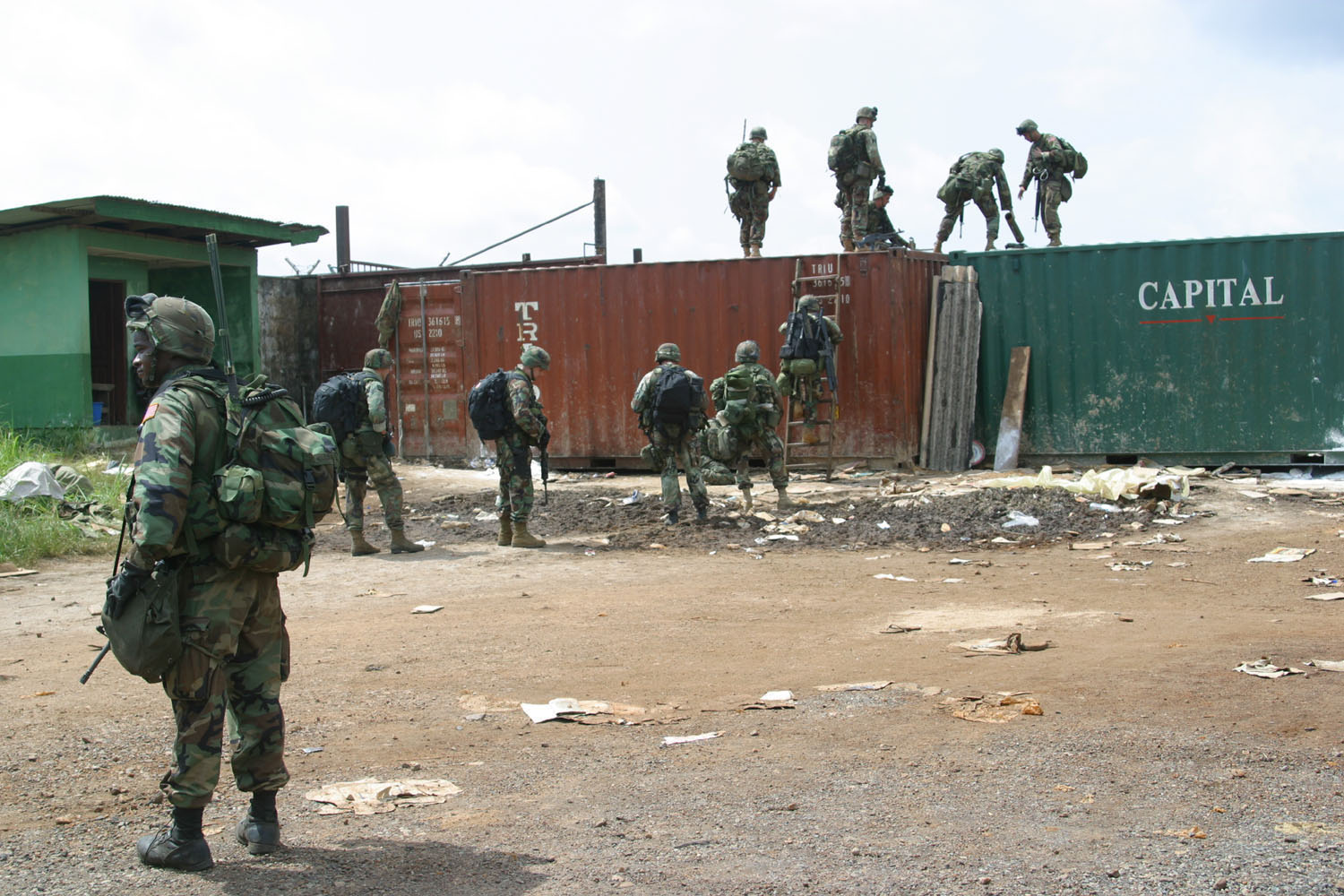
U.S. Marines from 26th Marine Expeditionary Unit (Special Operations Capable) secure the Freeport of Monrovia on Bushrod Island in Liberia during the Second Liberian Civil War. The 26th MEU (SOC) conducted a helicopter-borne landing at the port on August 15, 2003.
