= Monrovia Transit Authority =

The Monrovia Transit Authority (MTA) is a publicly owned company started 1979 in Monrovia, Liberia, to provide timetabled bus services in the capital city. Operations ceased prior to the war. The MTA owns and runs a depot outside of Monrovia in Gardnersville. The general manager of the MTA is Obedia Tarla.

As a result of the Liberian civil war, the premises of the MTA were completely vandalized, and sat desolate and dormant for over 20 years. In 2007 the transit system in the country was resuscitated.

== National Transit Authority ==
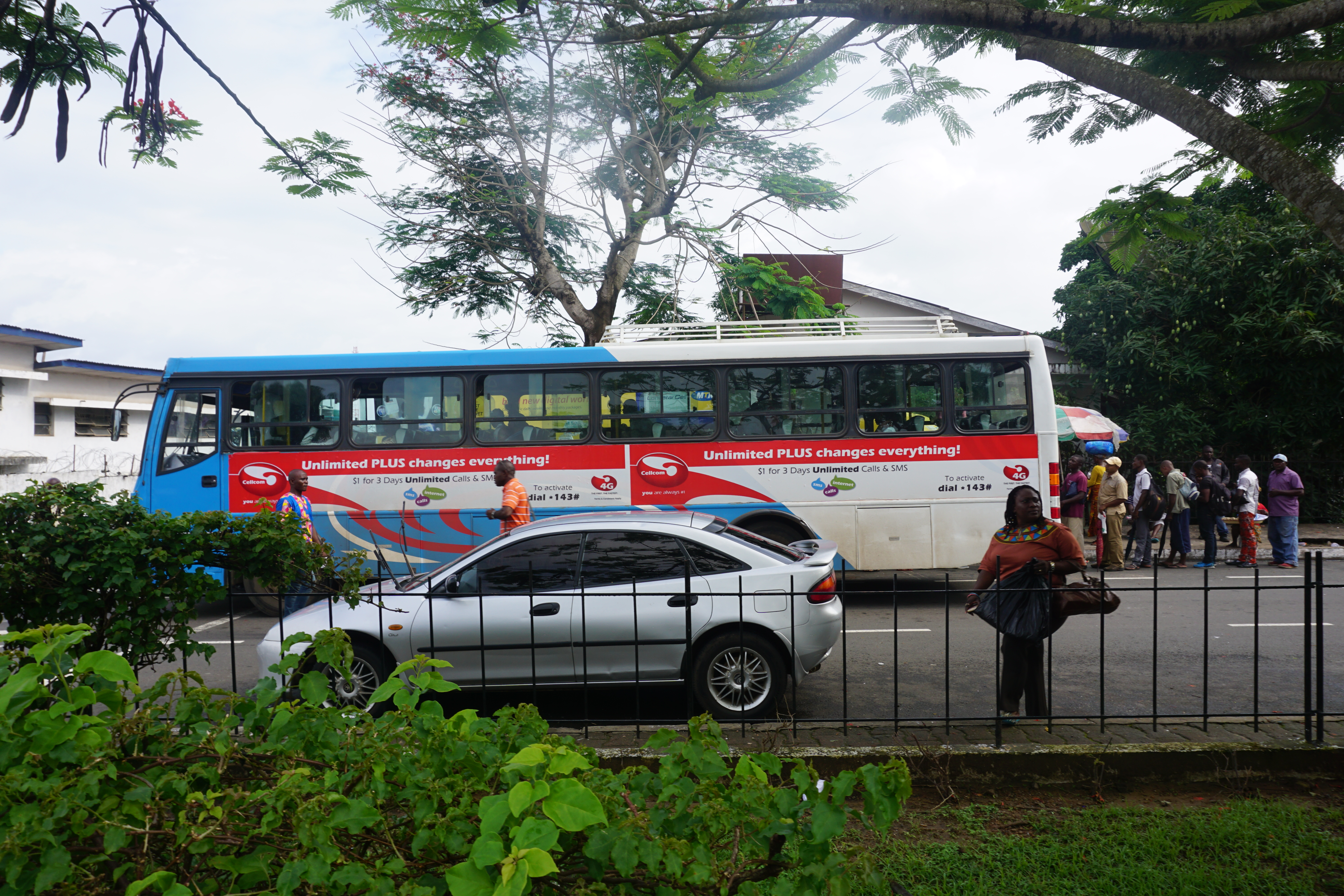
A National Transit Authority bus on Broad Street in Monrovia

In 2009, the National Transit Authority (NTA) was established to which the Monrovia Transit Authority became a subsidiary. The NTA will be responsible for passenger transport services throughout Liberia.

In October, 2011 the Government of India donated 25 Ashok Leyland Falcon buses. This donation was soon followed by the purchase of additional 8 new buses.
