= Liberian National Museum =

National Museum of Liberia
- Established: 1958
- Location: Monrovia, Liberia
- Coordinates: 6.3158°N 10.804°W
- Type: national museum

The National Museum of Liberia is a national museum in Monrovia, Liberia. Initially housed in the First Executive Mansion on Ashmun Street of the city which is now used as a library, it was established by an Act of the National Legislature in 1958 under the administration of Liberia's 18th President, Dr William V.S. Tubman. Partly funded by UNESCO, in coordination with the Department of Public instructions (what is now the Liberian Ministry of Education), its primary goal was to obtain, preserve and display cultural artefacts and other historical items which depict the country's heritage.

== History ==
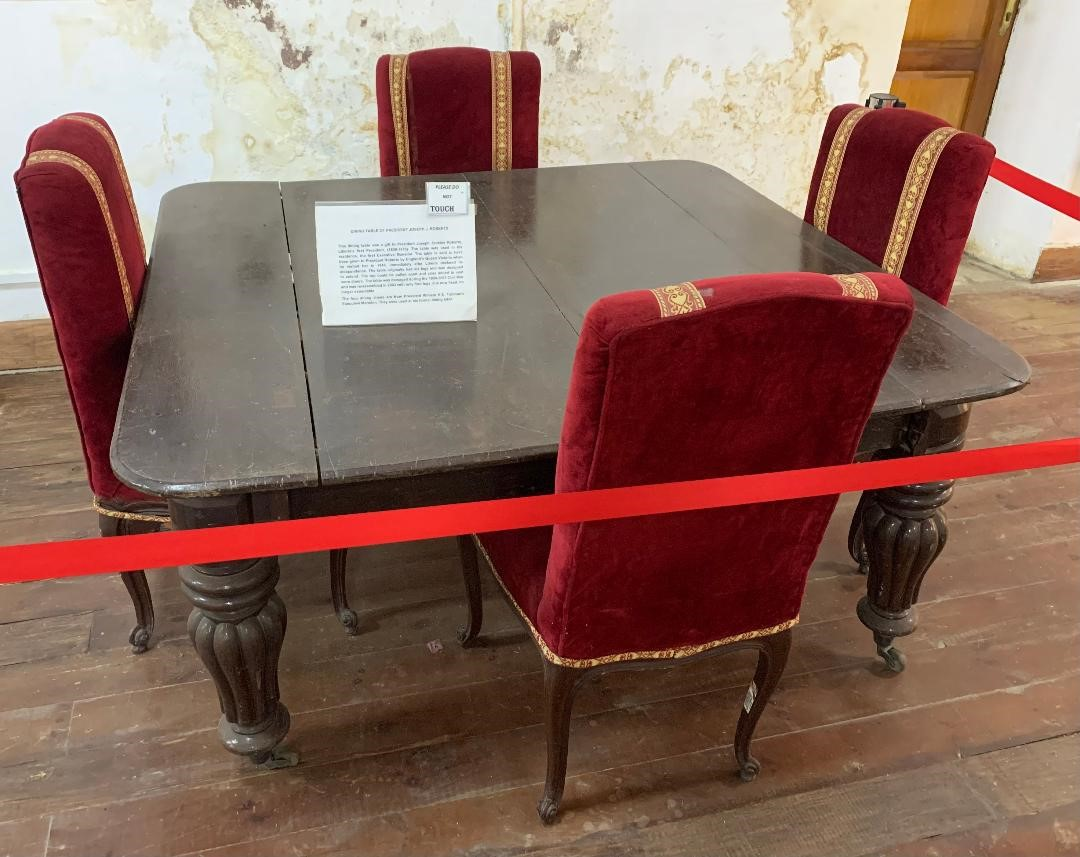
Dining table that Queen Victoria gave as a gift to President Roberts.

The museum remained under the Department of Public Instructions until 1965 when it became the responsibility of the Department of Information, Cultural Affairs and Tourism. In 1981 this detached to form the National Bureau of Culture & Tourism of which the museum operated under through much of the 1980s until June 1987 when it was dissolved and returned to the control of the Department of Information. In 1972, the museum was relocated to a new building on Providence Island but four years later this building was removed to facilitate the construction of the People's Bridge over the Mesurado River.

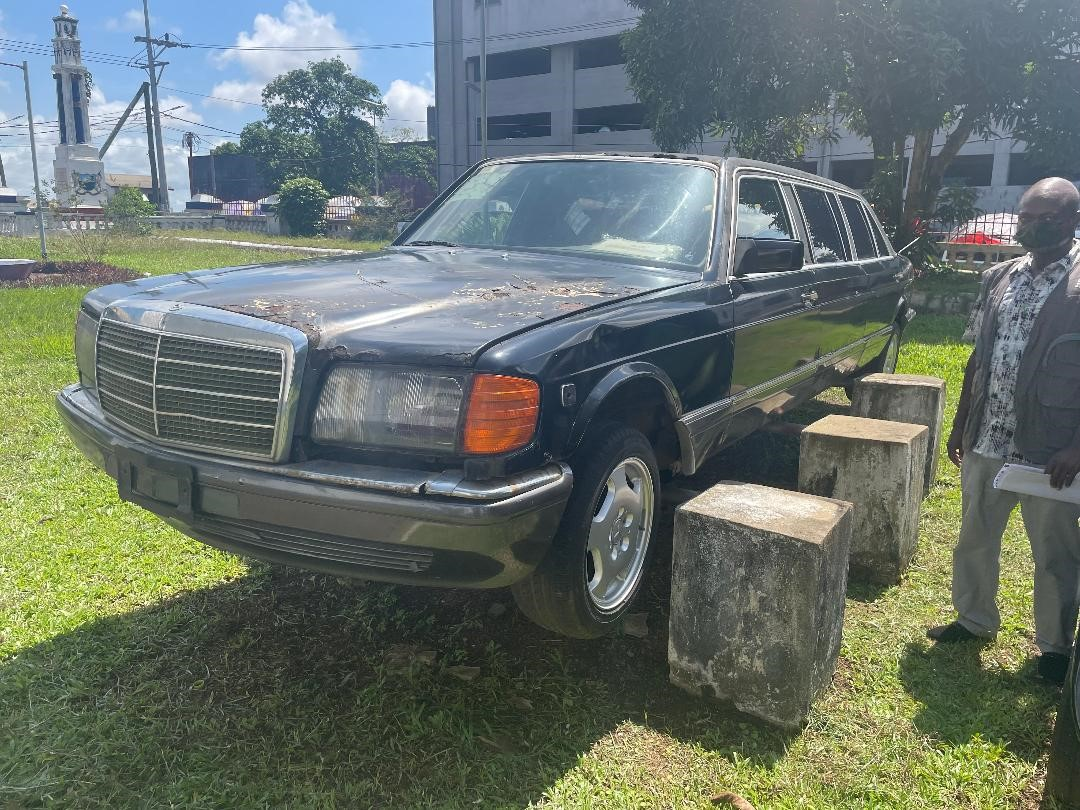
President Doe's limousine used in the 1980s.

It was later moved to the Old Supreme Court building and formally reopened on July 25, 1987 with a ceremony given by the Vice President of Liberia, Harry F. Moniba.

== Museum layout ==
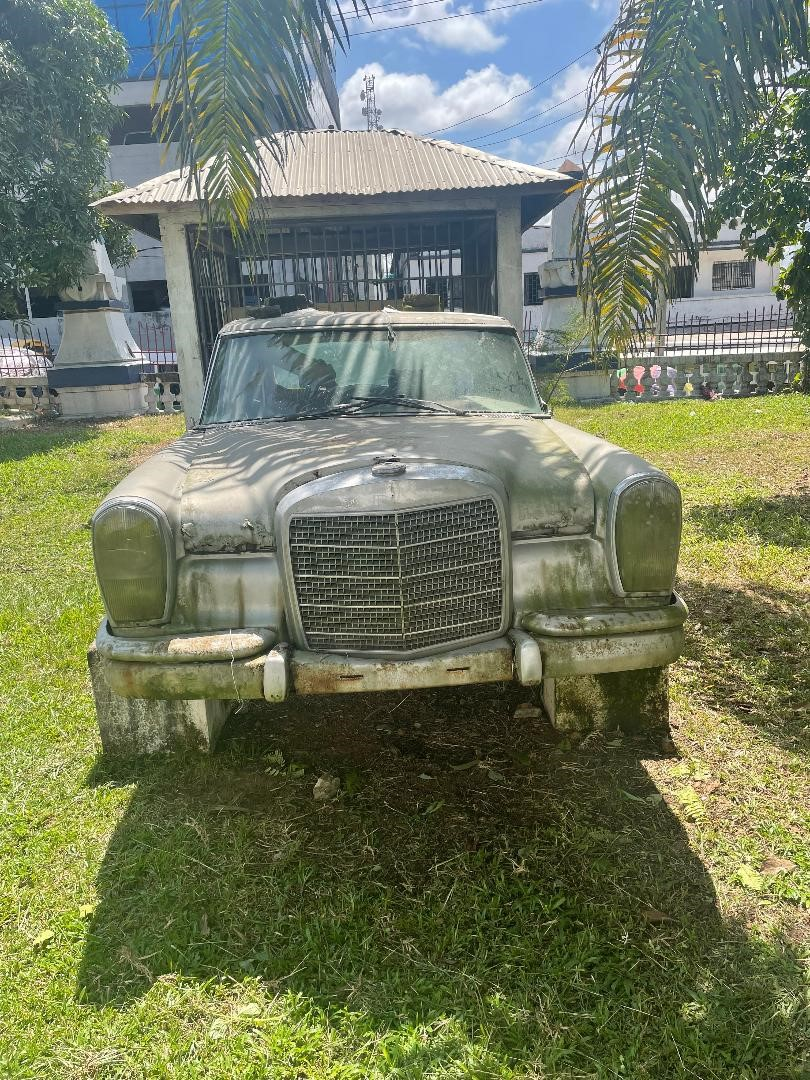
President Tubman's limousine.

The museum is classified in three tiers, where on the ground floor there is a histographical gallery containing presidential papers, private documents and memoirs of past important executives of the Liberian government and photographs and cartographical resources related to its culture. On display is the nation's first flag dating back to August 1847. There are also other items ranging from postage stamps to an editorial page of Liberia's daily newspaper, the Liberia Herald. Other items include traditional Liberian household furniture and utensils, and there is a craft shop run by the African Arts & Crafts Inc.

On the next floor is the Ethnographical Gallery and on the top floor the contemporary arts gallery which illustrates Liberian artistic works many of which are product of a contract between the museum and art institutions and art colleges throughout the country where artists are commissioned to produce for the museum purposes.

Other museum facilities include a portable video system, editing and archival materials, cassette recordings and slides of visual and oral arts many of which offer an insight into Liberian cultures such as dance and the use of masks in the country.

On the museum grounds, visitors are able to see several presidential limousines used by presidents Tubman and Doe.

== Effects of the Liberian civil war ==
The national museum was deeply affected by the 14 years of war during the First and Second Liberian Civil Wars. According to the director of the museum Caesar Harris approximately 5,000 artifacts were looted during this period and now less than 100 larger artifacts remain. Still intact though is a 250-year-old dining table given as gift from Queen Victoria to Liberia's first President, Joseph Jenkins Roberts. During the war, valuable museum items were often sold to fleeing expatriates and the museum itself came under fire during rebel attacks in 2003. However, although the war severely affected the content of the museum today it also has items which offer an insight into the war itself.
