= Gabriel Tucker Bridge =

Bridge in Liberia

Coordinates: 6°19′10″N 10°48′8″W

Gabriel Tucker Bridge (under construction, 1975)

The Gabriel Tucker Bridge (formerly the People's Bridge) is a bridge over the Mesurado River in Monrovia, Liberia. It was built between 1972 and 1976. The construction caused some minor disruption to local settlements and the Liberian National Museum had to be relocated in the mid-1970s to make room for its construction. It was designed by Gabriel Johnson Tucker, and the bridge was named in his honor by Liberian President William R. Tolbert.

The bridge connects United Nations Drive to Bushrod Island via Providence Island.
