= Mesurado River =

River in Liberia

Coordinates: 6.3176°N 10.798°W

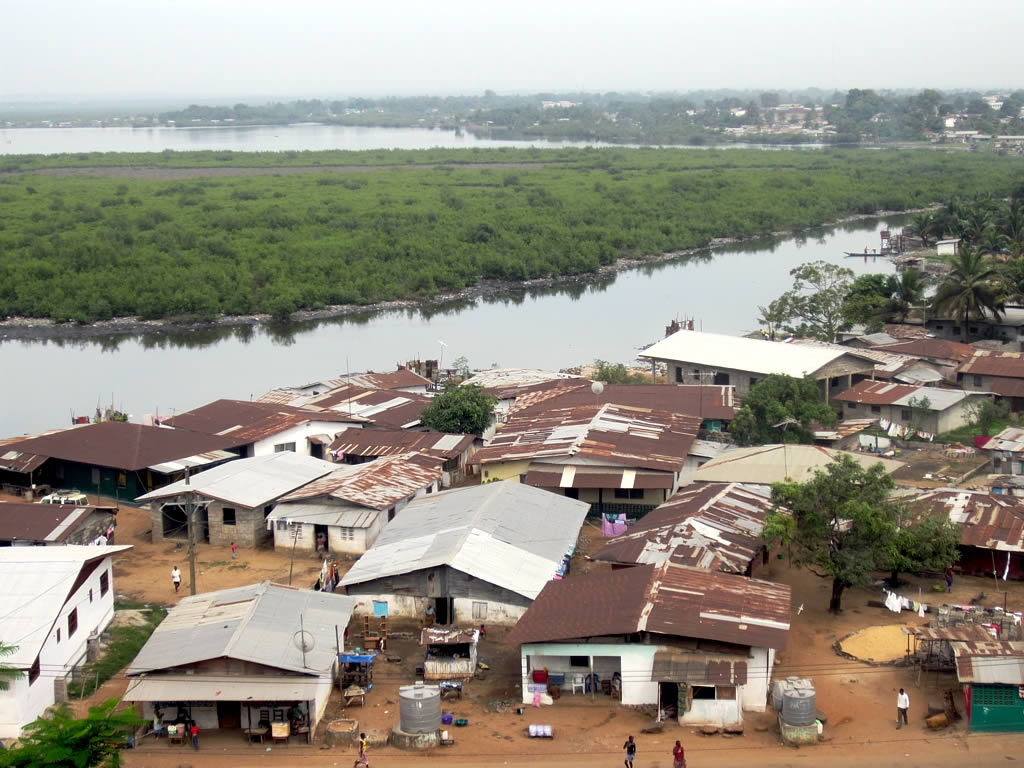
The Mesurado River in Monrovia.

Mesurado River is a river of Liberia. It flows through the capital of Monrovia and is crossed by the People's Bridge, built in the 1970s.
