= Monrovia =

Capital, chief port, and largest city of Liberia

- Capital city
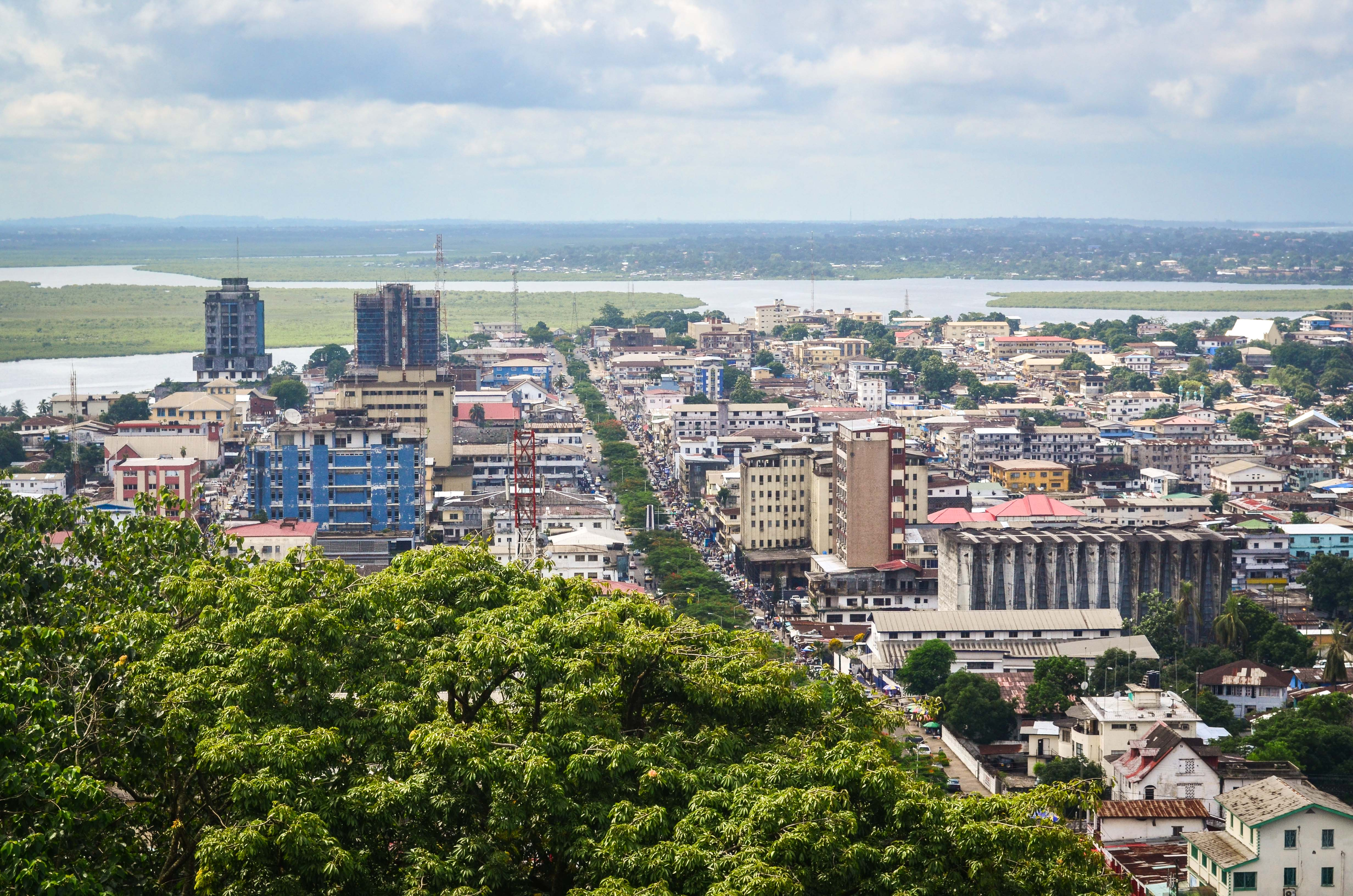
- Monrovia's skyline

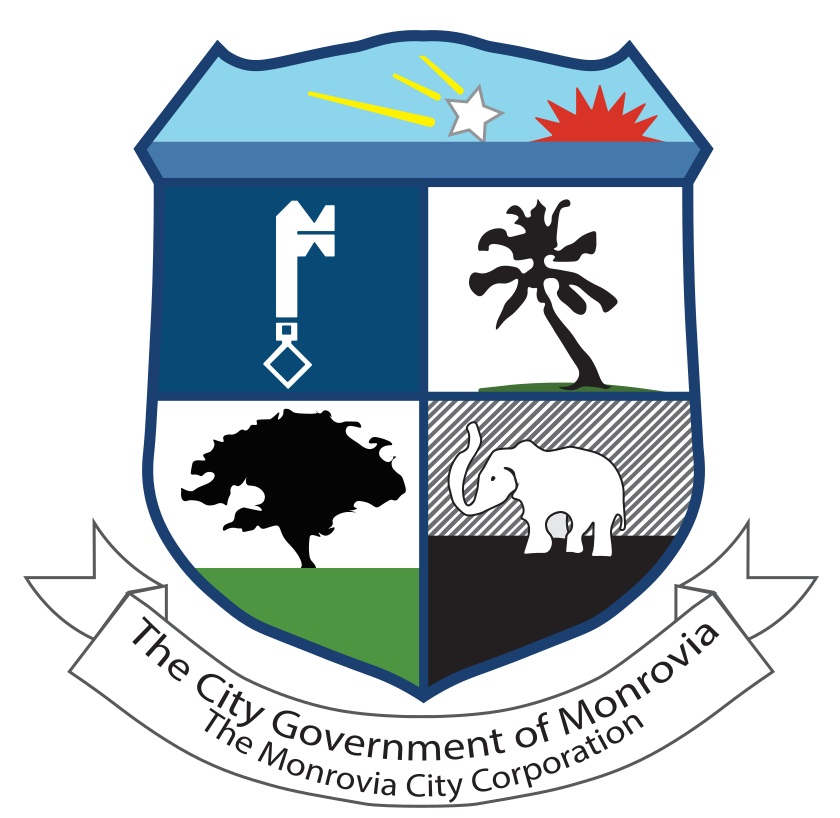
- Flag Seal

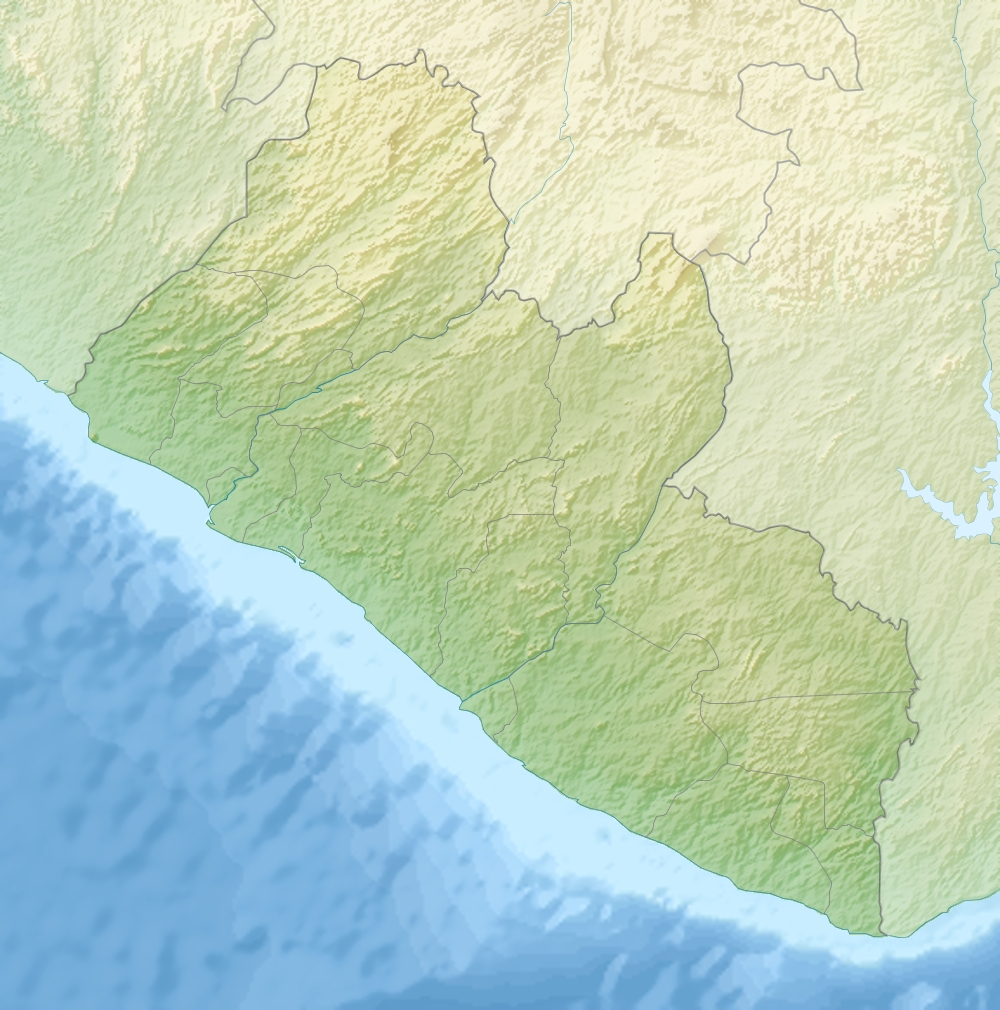
- Location within Liberia Monrovia (Africa)
- Coordinates: 6°18′48″N 10°48′5″W
- Country: Liberia
- County: Montserrado
- District: Greater Monrovia
- Established: 25 April 1822
- Named for: James Monroe, U.S. President

Government
  - Type: Local Government of Monrovia
  - Mayor: John-Charuk Saah Siafa

Area
  - Capital city: 75.00 sq mi (194.25 km^{2})
  - Land: 1,746 sq mi (4,523 km^{2})

Population (2022 Census)
  - Capital city: 1,761,032
  - Density: 23,500/sq mi (9,100/km^{2})
  - Metro: 2,225,911
- Time zone: UTC+00:00 (GMT)
- Climate: Am
- Website: monrovia.gov.lr

Monrovia (Note: /mənˈroʊviə/) is the capital and largest city of the African country of Liberia. Founded in 1822, it is located on Cape Mesurado on the Atlantic coast and, as of the 2022 census, had a population of 1,761,032 residents. Its largely urbanized metropolitan area, including Montserrado and Margibi counties, was home to 2,225,911 inhabitants as of the 2022 census, representing 33.5% of Liberia’s total population.

As the nation’s primary city, Monrovia is Liberia’s economic, financial, and cultural center. Its economy is primarily centered on its harbor and its role as the seat of the Liberian government, with the Freeport of Monrovia serving as the country’s largest and main port. Monrovia was traditionally the land of the Vai people and was founded in April 1822 by members of the American Colonization Society as a settlement for free people of color from the United States.

== Etymology ==
Monrovia is named in honor of U.S. President James Monroe, a prominent supporter of the colonization of Liberia and the American Colonization Society (ACS). Along with Washington, D.C., it is one of two world capitals to be named after an American president. The original name of Monrovia was Christopolis until 1824, only two years after the city's founding.

== History ==
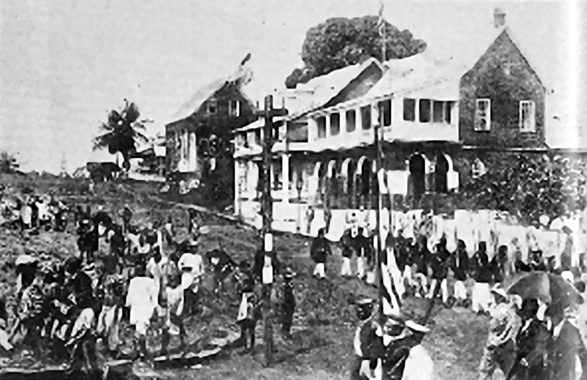
Monrovia in the 19th century

Before 1816, the area around Cape Mesurado and the mouth of the Mesurado River was called Ducor. It had long been established as a crossroads and a place of trade inhabited by fishing, trading and farming communities of various ethnicities, including the Dey, Kru, Bassa, Gola, and Vai. The French cartographer and slave trader Chevalier des Marchais visited Ducor and the Cape in 1723, conducted business there and later published a map of the area.

In 1821, with the aim of establishing a self-sufficient colony for free people of color from the United States, something that had already been accomplished with British Black Loyalists in Freetown, the first group of African American settlers arrived in West Africa from the United States under the auspices of the American Colonization Society and with the support of the U.S. government. They landed on Sherbro Island, part of modern-day Sierra Leone.

On 7 January 1822, a ship took these settlers to Dazoe Island (now called Providence Island) at the mouth of the Mesurado River. They subsequently went ashore at Cape Mesurado, and established a settlement they called Christopolis.

Prior to the establishment of the settlement, representatives of the American Colonization Society negotiated the purchase of land at Cape Mesurado in December 1821 from local leaders. The agreement, which covered a relatively small coastal area and was valued at approximately $300 in trade goods, has been the subject of historical debate, with modern scholarship revisiting earlier claims about the circumstances and nature of the transaction.

In 1824, the city was renamed Monrovia after James Monroe, president of the United States at the time. Monroe was a prominent supporter of plans to create a colony of some sort as a place to relocate African Americans from the United States of America and combat the Atlantic Slave Trade. He likewise signed into law the Anti-Slave Trading Act of 1819, which funded the ACS's mission to create such a colony in West Africa.

In 1845 there was a constitutional convention in Monrovia. At this convention a document was drafted that would be adopted two years later as the constitution of the newly independent and sovereign Republic of Liberia. During World War I the city was affected by the German bombing of Monrovia.

At the beginning of the 20th century 2,500 of Monrovia's 4,000 residents were Americo-Liberian. At that time Monrovia consisted of two sectors: Monrovia proper and Krutown. The city's Americo-Liberian population resided in the former sector. Because of American settlers' influence the architectural style of its buildings was reminiscent of that of the southern United States. Krutown was inhabited mainly by ethnic Krus, but also by Bassas, Grebos and members of other ethnic groups. By 1926 ethnic groups from Liberia's interior began to migrate outwards toward Monrovia in search of jobs. By 1937 Monrovia's population had grown to 10,000. At this time the town had 30 police officers.

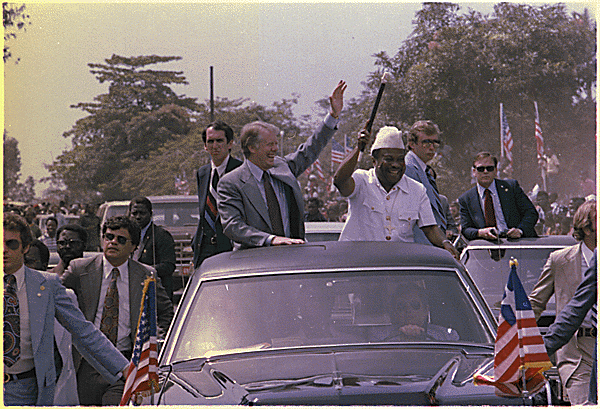
Visiting US President Jimmy Carter and Liberian President William Tolbert wave from their motorcade, 1978.

In 1979, the Organisation of African Unity, chaired by the then president of Liberia, William Tolbert, held its conference near Monrovia. During his term, Tolbert improved public housing in Monrovia and slashed tuition fees at the University of Liberia in half. In 1980 a military coup led by Samuel Doe overthrew the Tolbert government and executed many of its members. Tolbert, and others who were killed in the coup, were buried in a mass grave in Palm Grove Cemetery.

The First Liberian Civil War (1989 to 1997) and Second Liberian Civil War (1999 to 2003) severely damaged the infrastructure of the city. Much of the damage occurred during the siege of Monrovia. Major battles included clashes between Samuel Doe's government forces and Prince Johnson's forces in 1990 and the National Patriotic Front of Liberia's assault on the city in 1992. During these wars young children and youth, deprived of resources and schooling, were forced to involve themselves in the fighting. Afterwards, many of them were left homeless.

In 2002 Leymah Gbowee organized the Women of Liberia Mass Action for Peace, a group consisting of local Monrovian women, who gathered in a fish market to pray and sing. This movement helped to end the war the following year and to bring about the election of Ellen Johnson Sirleaf as president of Liberia, which made it the first African nation to have a female president.

In 2014 Monrovia was affected by the 2014 West Africa Ebola outbreak. The Ebola virus epidemic in Liberia was declared over on 3 September 2015.

== Geography ==
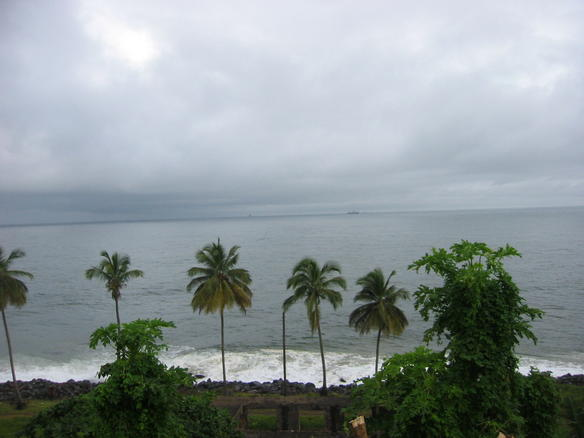
The Atlantic Ocean as seen from Monrovia

Monrovia lies along the Cape Mesurado peninsula, between the Atlantic Ocean and the Mesurado River, whose mouth forms a large natural harbor. The harbor was significantly expanded by U.S. forces during the Second World War. The Saint Paul River lies directly north of the city and forms the northern boundary of Bushrod Island, which is reached by crossing the "New Bridge" from downtown Monrovia. Monrovia is located in Montserrado County and is Liberia's largest city as its administrative, commercial and financial center.

=== Climate ===
Monrovia's climate is classified as a tropical monsoon climate (Am) within the Köppen climate classification. It is the wettest capital city in the world, with annual rainfall averaging 182 inches (4,600 mm). It has a wet season and a dry season but gets precipitation even during the dry season. Temperatures are fairly constant throughout the year, averaging around 79.5 °F (26.4 °C). The only slight variations are in the high temperatures, which are around 81 °F (27 °C) in the winter and near 90 °F (32 °C) in the summer. Lows are usually between 72 and 75 °F (22 and 24 °C) year-round.

Climate data for Roberts International Airport, 37 miles (60 km) east of Monrovia, Liberia (1991-2020)
Month	Jan	Feb	Mar	Apr	May	Jun	Jul	Aug	Sep	Oct	Nov	Dec	Year
Record high °F (°C)	95.0 (35.0)	100.4 (38.0)	98.6 (37.0)	100.4 (38.0)	95.0 (35.0)	91.4 (33.0)	96.8 (36.0)	95.0 (35.0)	89.6 (32.0)	91.4 (33.0)	96.8 (36.0)	93.2 (34.0)	100.4 (38.0)
Mean daily maximum °F (°C)	87.3 (30.7)	89.1 (31.7)	89.4 (31.9)	88.0 (31.1)	86.0 (30.0)	84.0 (28.9)	82.0 (27.8)	81.0 (27.2)	82.9 (28.3)	84.9 (29.4)	86.5 (30.3)	87.1 (30.6)	85.6 (29.8)
Daily mean °F (°C)	80.4 (26.9)	81.5 (27.5)	82.2 (27.9)	81.5 (27.5)	80.4 (26.9)	79.0 (26.1)	77.5 (25.3)	77.0 (25.0)	77.9 (25.5)	79.5 (26.4)	80.1 (26.7)	80.6 (27.0)	79.9 (26.6)
Mean daily minimum °F (°C)	73.0 (22.8)	73.9 (23.3)	75.0 (23.9)	75.0 (23.9)	75.0 (23.9)	73.9 (23.3)	73.0 (22.8)	73.0 (22.8)	73.0 (22.8)	73.9 (23.3)	73.9 (23.3)	73.9 (23.3)	73.9 (23.3)
Record low °F (°C)	59.0 (15.0)	64.4 (18.0)	64.4 (18.0)	69.8 (21.0)	68.0 (20.0)	68.0 (20.0)	68.0 (20.0)	68.0 (20.0)	62.6 (17.0)	68.0 (20.0)	68.0 (20.0)	60.8 (16.0)	59.0 (15.0)
Average rainfall inches (mm)	1.0 (26)	1.9 (48)	3.8 (97)	6.3 (160)	16.4 (416)	32.2 (818)	27.4 (696)	22.1 (561)	36.0 (914)	23.1 (587)	7.5 (190)	1.9 (48)	179.6 (4,561)
Average rainy days	4	3	8	12	22	24	21	17	24	22	16	9	182
Average relative humidity (%)	78	76	77	80	79	82	83	84	86	84	80	79	81
Mean monthly sunshine hours	158	167	198	195	155	105	84	81	96	121	147	155	1,662
Source 1: Deutscher Wetterdienst (average temperature and extremes only)
Source 2: Danish Meteorological Institute

=== Neighborhoods ===
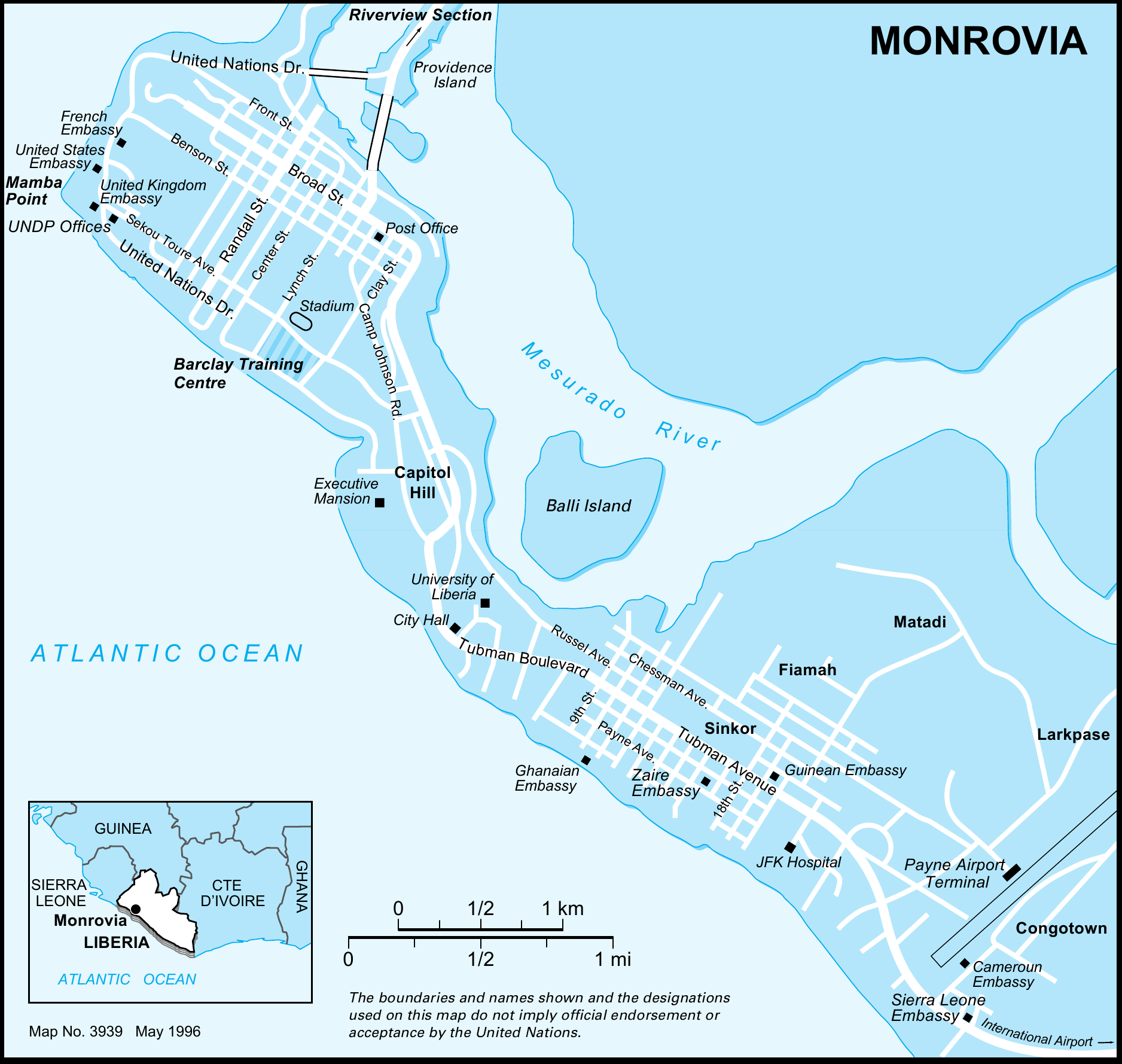
A map of central Monrovia in 1996

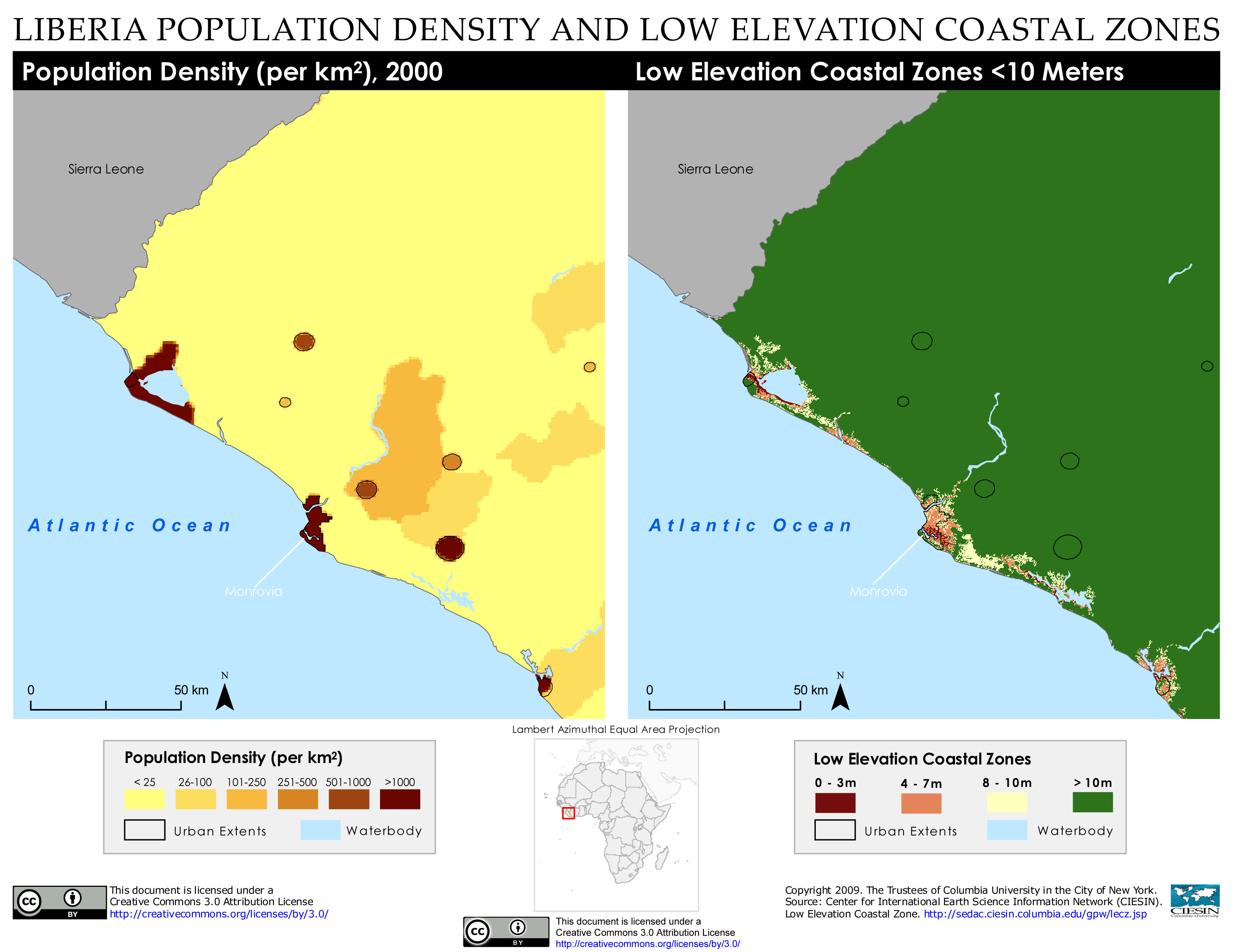
Monrovia's population density and low elevation coastal zones. Monrovia is especially vulnerable to sea level rise.

Monrovia comprises several districts spread across the Mesurado peninsula; the greater metropolitan area encircles the mouth of the marshy Mesurado River. The historic downtown area, centered on Broad Street, is at the very end of the peninsula; the major market district, Waterside, immediately to its north, faces the city's large natural harbor.

Northwest of Waterside is the large, low-income West Point community. To the west and southwest of the downtown area is Mamba Point, traditionally the city's principal diplomatic quarter and home to the embassies of the United States and United Kingdom, as well as the European Union delegation. South of the city center is Capitol Hill, where the major institutions of the national government, including the Temple of Justice and the Executive Mansion, are located.

Further east along the peninsula is the Sinkor section of Monrovia. Originally a suburban residential district, today Sinkor is the bustling midtown section of the city. It includes many diplomatic missions, major hotels, businesses, and residential neighborhoods, including informal communities such as Plumkor, Jorkpentown, Lakpazee and Fiamah. Sinkor is home to the city's secondary airport, Spriggs Payne. The area immediately next to the airport, called Airfield, is a major nightlife district for the whole city. East of the Airfield is the Old Road section of Sinkor, which is predominantly residential, and includes informal settlements such as Chugbor and Gaye Town.

At the southeastern base of the peninsula is the independent township of Congo Town, and to its east is the large suburb of Paynesville. Other suburbs, such as Chocolate City, Gardnersville, Barnesville, Kaba Town, Dandawailo, and New Georgia lie to the north, across the river. On Bushrod Island, north of Monrovia, are the neighborhoods of Clara Town, Logan Town and New Kru Town. To the far east are the suburbs of Stockton Creek Bridge, Caldwell, Louisiana, and Cassava Hill.

Other neighborhoods and suburbs of Monrovia include

- Bakoi
- Banjoa
- Barekling
- Bassa Community
- Buzzi Quarters
- Clara Town
- Crown Hill
- Dixville
- Doin Town
- Dwahn Town
- Duala
- Fanti Town
- Jatuja
- Jacob Town
- Jallah Town
- Logan Town
- Matadi
- New Kru Town
- Old Road
- Point Four
- Red Light
- Slipway
- Snapper Hill
- South Beach
- Toe Town
- Tomo
- Topoe Village
- Vai Town
- Virginia

== Notable people ==
- Mary Antoinette Brown-Sherman (1926–2004), Liberian educator and first woman president of the University of Liberia
- Prince Johnson, Liberian politician
- Clarence Kparghai, Swiss ice hockey player
- Mon Rovîa, Afro-Appalachian singer-songwriter from Liberia
- Sio Moore, American football player
- Darlington Nagbe, American soccer player
- Aloysius Wleh Penie, Liberian footballer
- Massimo Pigliucci (born 1964), ecological and evolutionary geneticist
- Ellen Johnson Sirleaf, former president of Liberia
- Takun J, Liberian musician
- Charles Taylor, former president of Liberia
- Benoni Urey, Liberian businessman
- George Weah, Liberian president and former footballer
- Ashton Youboty, American football player
- Gus Edwards, American football player

== Economy ==
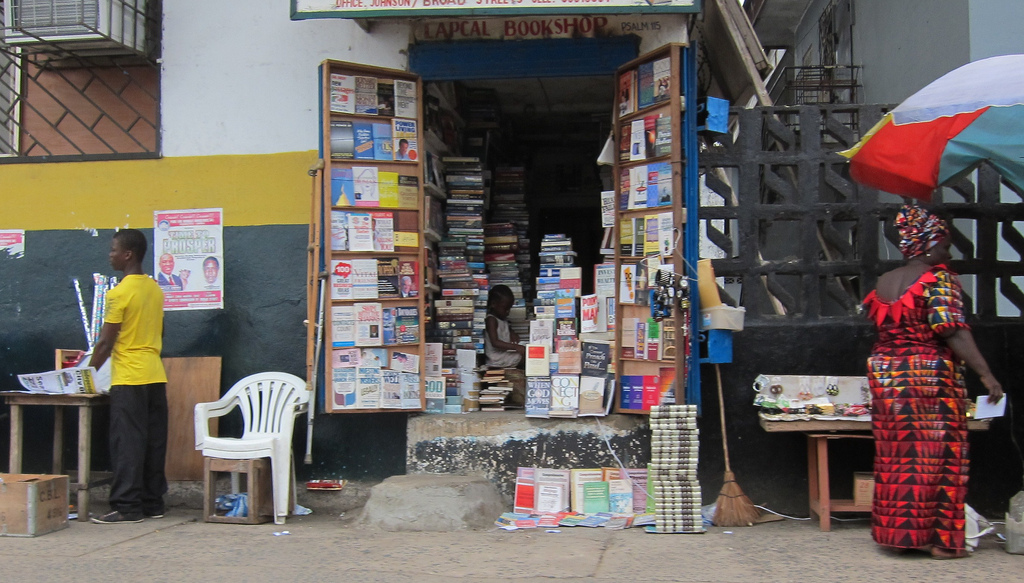
A market stall in central Monrovia

Monrovia's economy is dominated by its expanded harbor - the Freeport of Monrovia - and as the location of Liberia's government offices. The city's main exports include latex and iron ore, and fishing makes an important economic contribution, although fishing is unsafe and local estimates state that until recently five people died each month on average off the coast.

== Transport ==
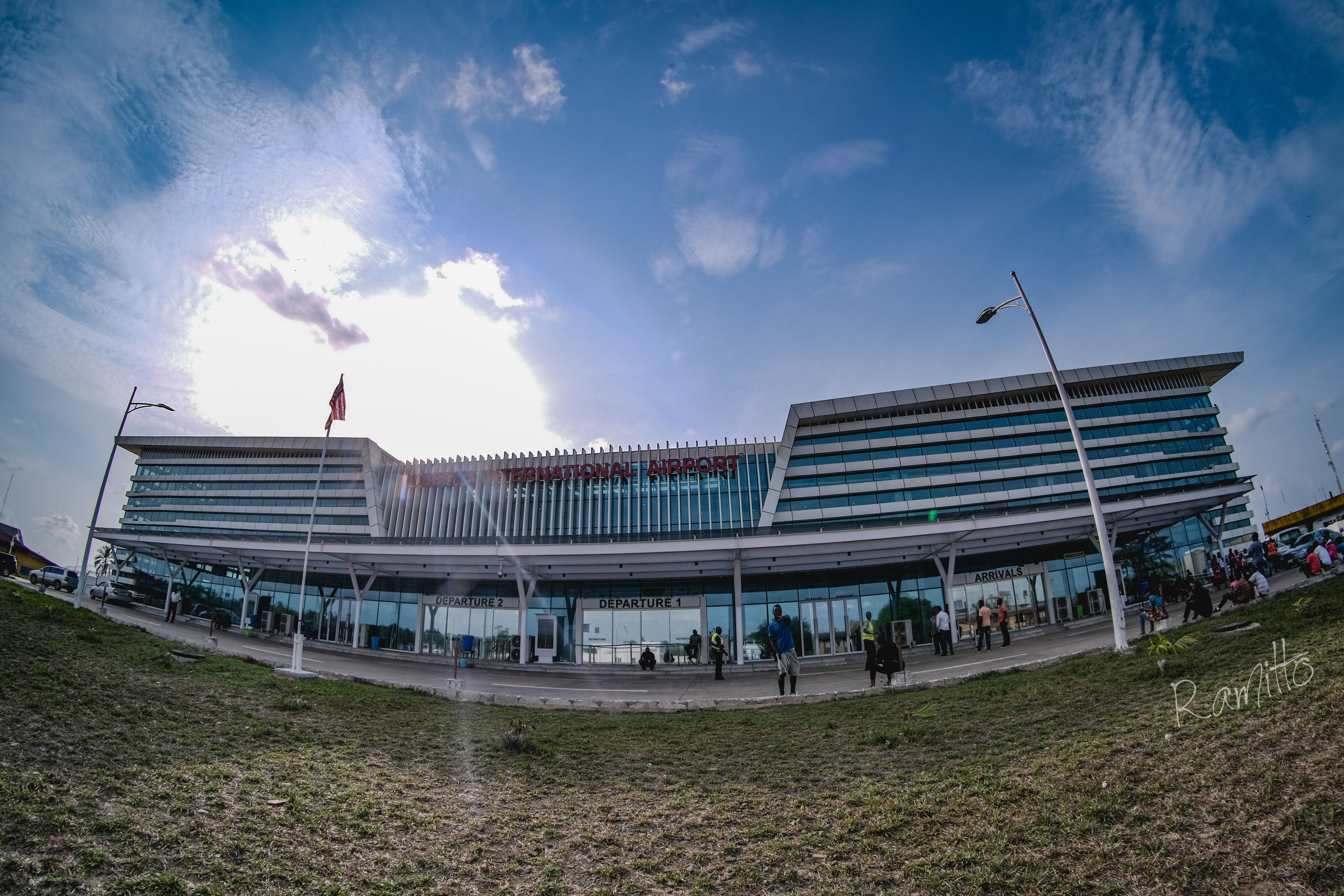
Roberts International Airport Terminal

Boats link the city's Freeport of Monrovia, the country's busiest port, with Greenville and Harper. The nearest airport is Spriggs Payne Airport, located less than four miles (6.4 km) from the city center. Roberts International Airport, the largest international airport in Liberia, is 37 miles (60 km) away in Harbel.

Monrovia is connected with the rest of the country via a network of roads and railways. Monrovia is listed as the home port by between ten and fifteen percent of the world's merchant shipping, registered in Liberia under Flag of Convenience arrangements. Both private taxis and minibuses run in the city, and are supplemented by larger buses run by the Monrovia Transit Authority.

In recent years (2005–present) the roads on many streets in Monrovia have been rebuilt by the World Bank and the Liberian Government. Private and public infrastructures are being built or renovated as reconstruction takes place.

== Administration and government ==
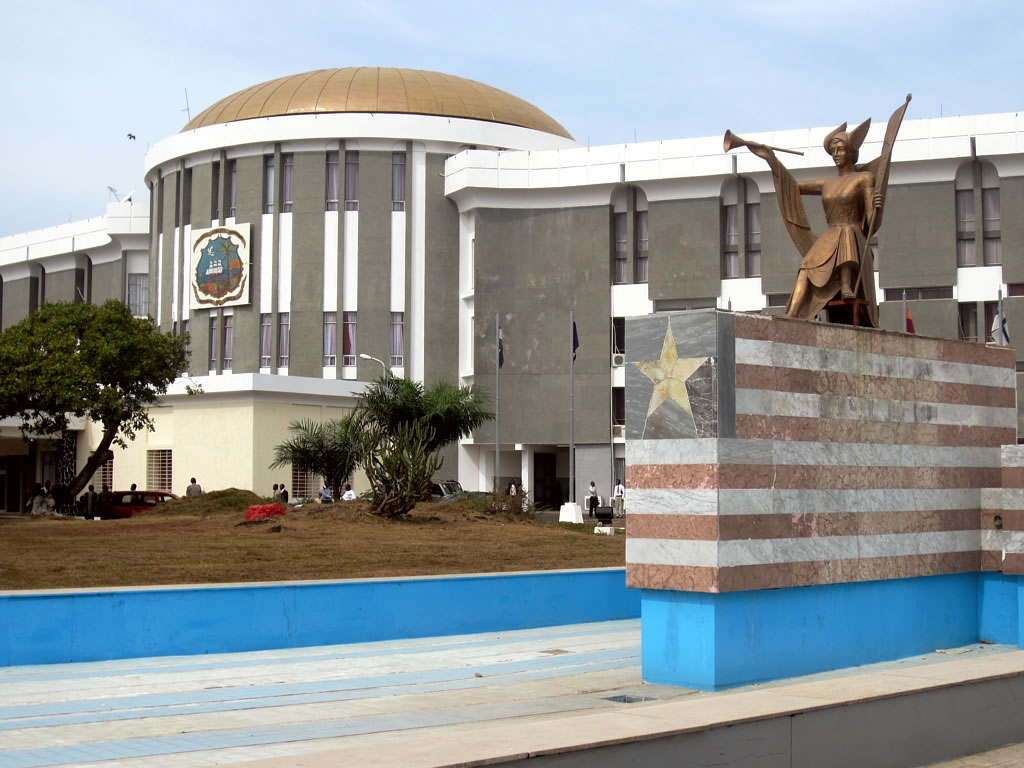
The Liberian Capitol Building

Monrovia is situated in the district of Greater Monrovia in Montserrado County. Instead of being divided into clans like other districts of Liberia, Greater Monrovia is divided into 16 "zones". Like clans, these zones are subdivided into 161 communities. Greater Monrovia does not have an organized district administration like other districts, with all lower-level local authorities being directly supervised by the Montserrado County Superintendent.

Municipally, Greater Monrovia District is subdivided into two city corporations and ten other local authorities (nine townships and one borough). Established in 1973 and operational since 1976, the Monrovia City Corporation (MCC) is responsible for the city's administration. The MCC provides services to the townships and borough through a revenue-sharing arrangement, but has no zoning or enforcement jurisdiction in them.

City corporations

- Monrovia City Corporation
- Paynesville City Corporation

Townships

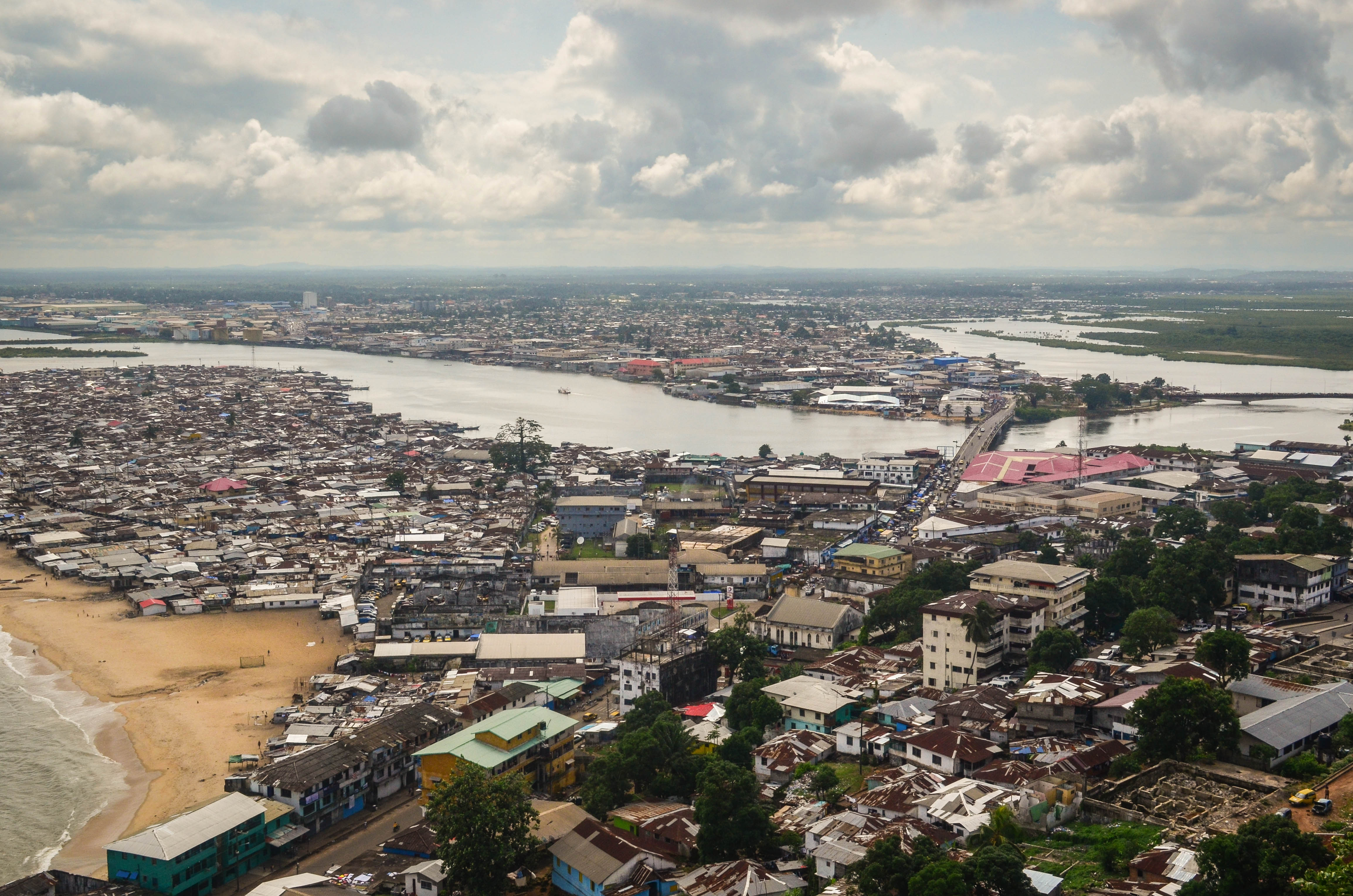
Clara Town is across the bridge on Bushrod Island. To the left of the photo is the slum of West Point.

- Barnesville
- Caldwell
- Congo Town
- Dixville
- Gardnersville
- Garworlon
- Johnsonville
- New Georgia
- West Point

Borough

- New Kru Town

Former mayors include:

- W. F. Nelson, 1870s
- C. T. O. King, 1880s and served three terms
- H. A. Williams, 1890s
- Arthur Barclay, 1892–1902
- Gabriel M. Johnson, 1912–1913; 1920–1921
- Thomas J.R. Faulkner, 1914–1918
- Nathan C. Ross, 1956–1969
- Ellen A. Sandimanie, 1970–1973
- Ophelia Hoff Saytumah, 2001–2009
- Mary Broh, February 2009 – February 2013
- Henry Reed Cooper, March 2013 – July 2013
- Clara Doe-Mvogo, March 2014 – January 2018
- Jefferson Tamba Koijee, January 2018 – January 2024

== Culture and media ==
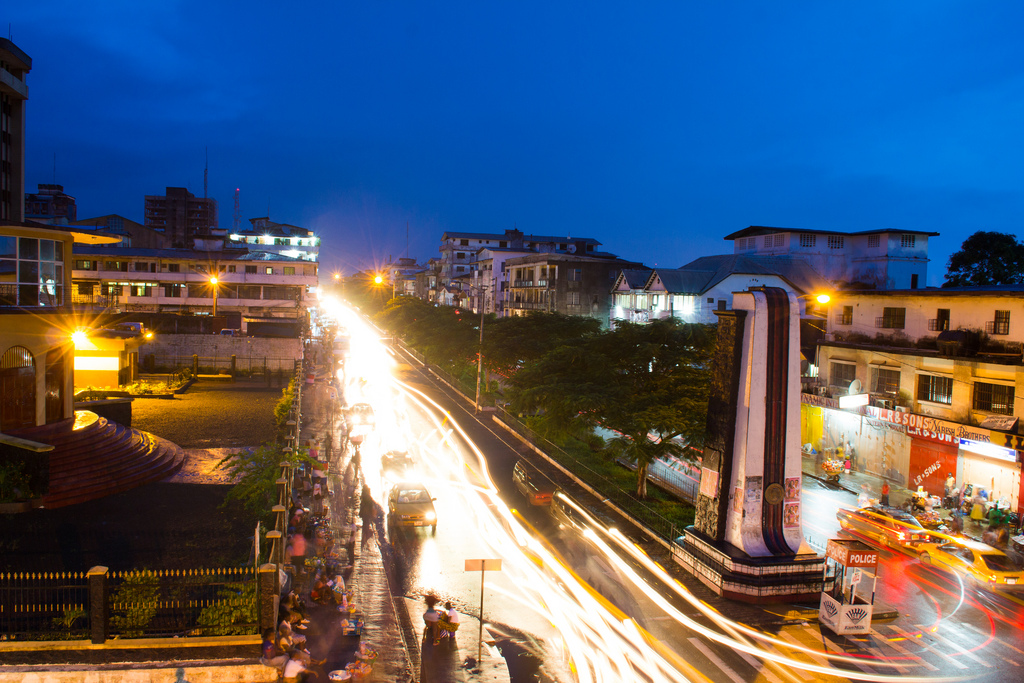
Broad Street, Monrovia at night

Cultural attractions in Monrovia include the Liberian National Museum, the Masonic Temple, the Waterside Market, and several beaches. The city also houses Antoinette Tubman Stadium and the Samuel Kanyon Doe Sports Complex, with seats for 22,000.

The newspaper industry in Monrovia dates back to the 1820s, with the founding of the Liberia Herald, one of the first newspapers to be published in Africa. Today, numerous tabloid-style newspapers are printed daily or bi-weekly, most are 20 pages or less. The Daily Talk is a compilation of news and Bible quotations written daily on a roadside blackboard in the Sinkor section of Monrovia.

Monrovia also has radio and TV stations. Radio is the dominant source of news, because problems with the electric grid make watching television more difficult. UNMIL Radio has been broadcasting since October 2003, and is the only 24 hour radio station in Liberia. It reaches an estimated 2/3 of the population. The state-owned Liberia Broadcasting System broadcasts nationwide from its headquarters in Monrovia. STAR radio broadcasts at 104 FM.

== Education ==
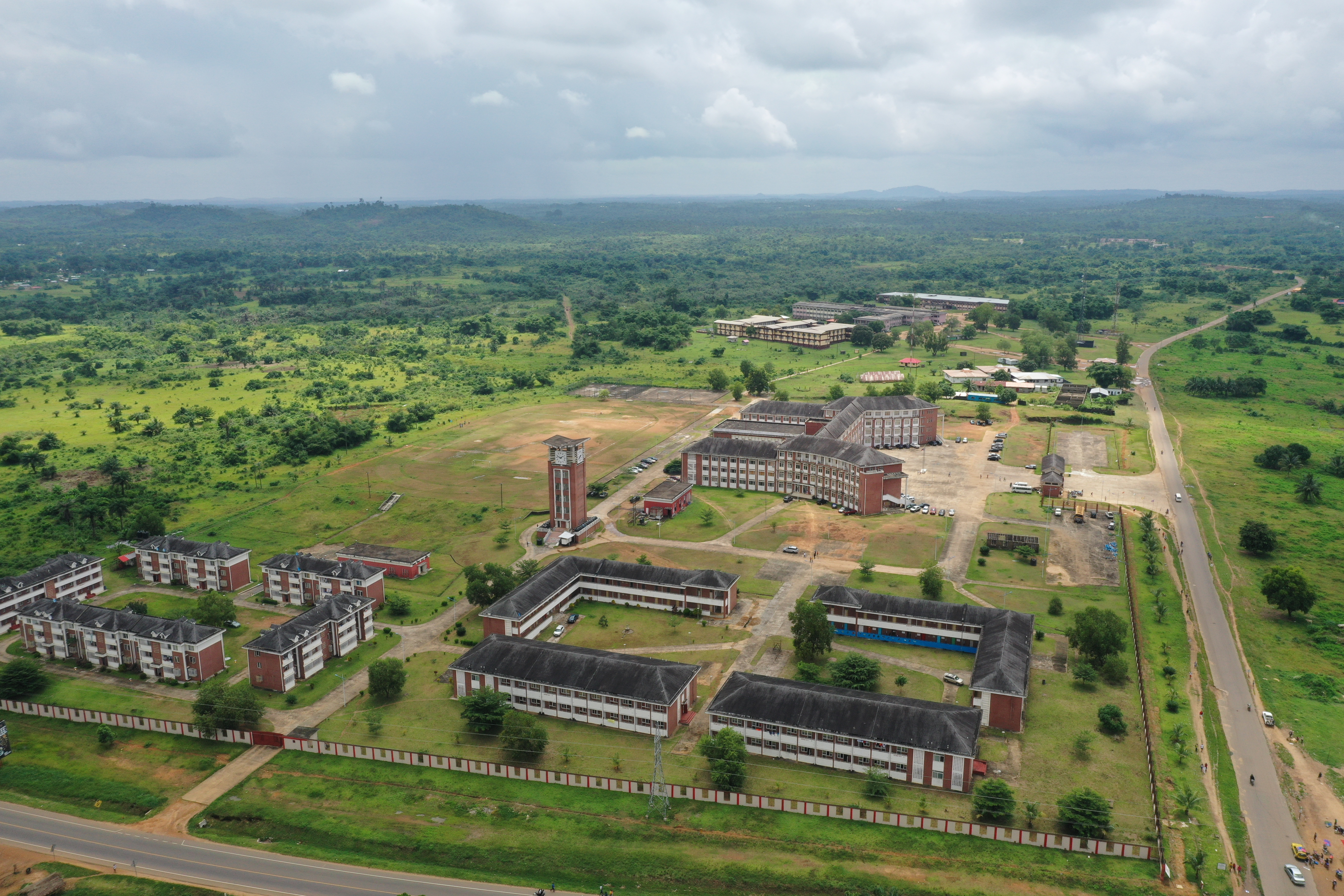
An aerial view of the University of Liberia Fendell campus, on the outskirts of Monrovia

Monrovia is home to the University of Liberia, along with African Methodist Episcopal University, United Methodist University, Stella Maris Polytechnic, and many other public and private schools. Medical education is offered at the A.M. Dogliotti College of Medicine, and there is a nursing and paramedical school at the Tubman National Institute of Medical Arts.

Kindergarten through twelfth grade education is provided by the Monrovia Consolidated School System, which serves the greater Monrovia area. Schools include Monrovia Central High School, Bostwain High School, D. Twe High School, G. W. Gibson High School and William V. S. Tubman High School.

The American International School of Monrovia is located in Congo Town.

== Places of worship ==
The places of worship in Monrovia are predominantly Christian churches and temples. These include the Roman Catholic Archdiocese of Monrovia (Catholic Church), the United Methodist Church in Liberia (World Methodist Council), the Liberia Baptist Missionary and Educational convention (Baptist World Alliance) and the Assemblies of God. In October 2021, The Church of Jesus Christ of Latter Day Saints announced plans to construct a temple in Monrovia. The city also has Muslim mosques.

== Pollution ==
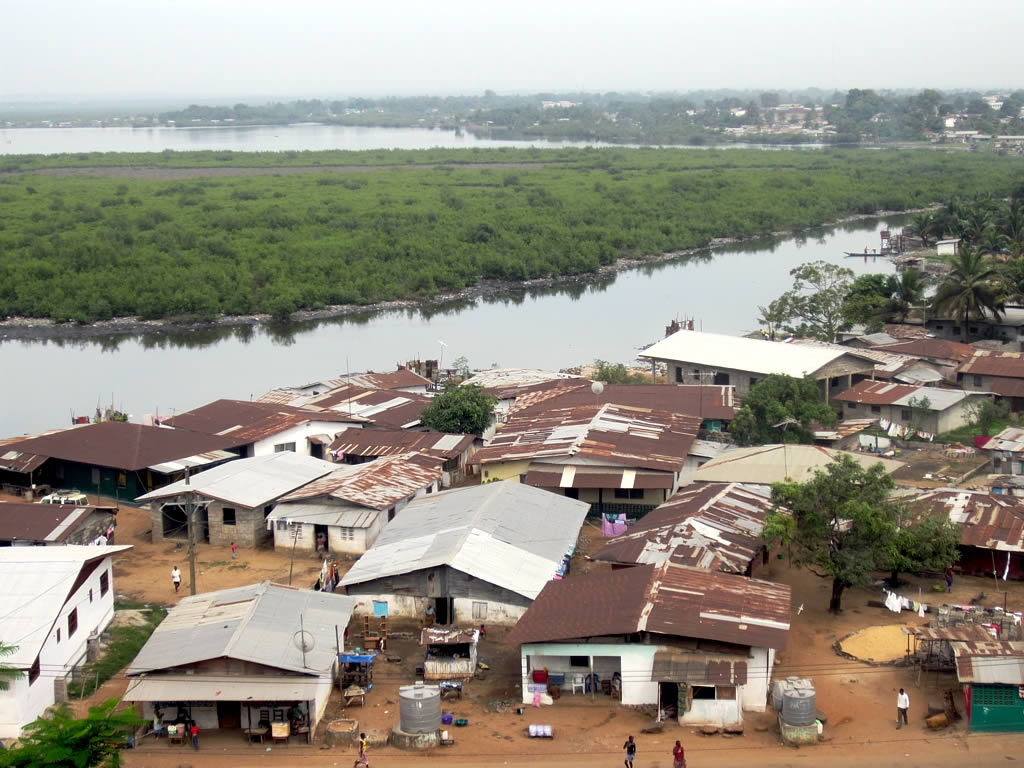
Dwellings along the Mesurado River in Monrovia. Discarded plastics can be seen washed up on the bank opposite the buildings.

Pollution is a significant challenge in Monrovia. Piles of household and industrial rubbish tend to build up. The World Bank pays sanitation companies to collect it, but collections are irregular.

In 2013, the problem of uncollected rubbish in the Paynesville area of Monrovia became so acute that traders and residents burnt "the huge garbage piles that seemed on the verge of cutting off the main road" out of Monrovia to Kakata.

Flooding brings additional environmental problems to residents: flood water picks up the waste that has been deposited in swamps at the edge of residential areas, and spreads it around.

In 2009, only one-third of Monrovia's 1.5 million people had access to clean toilets. Those without their own toilets defecate in the narrow alleyways between their houses, or on the beach, or into plastic bags that they dump onto nearby piles of rubbish or into the sea.

Congested housing, a lack of any requirement that landlords provide working toilets, and virtually no urban planning "have combined to create lethal sanitation conditions in the capital".

== International relations ==
=== Twin towns – Sister cities ===
Monrovia is twinned with:

- Taipei, Taiwan
- Dayton, Ohio, United States

== See also ==
- John F. Kennedy Medical Center
- Palm Grove Cemetery
- Sacred Heart Cathedral, Monrovia
- Executive Mansion

General:

- History of Liberia
