= Firestone Natural Rubber Company =

American rubber company

Firestone Natural Rubber Company, LLC
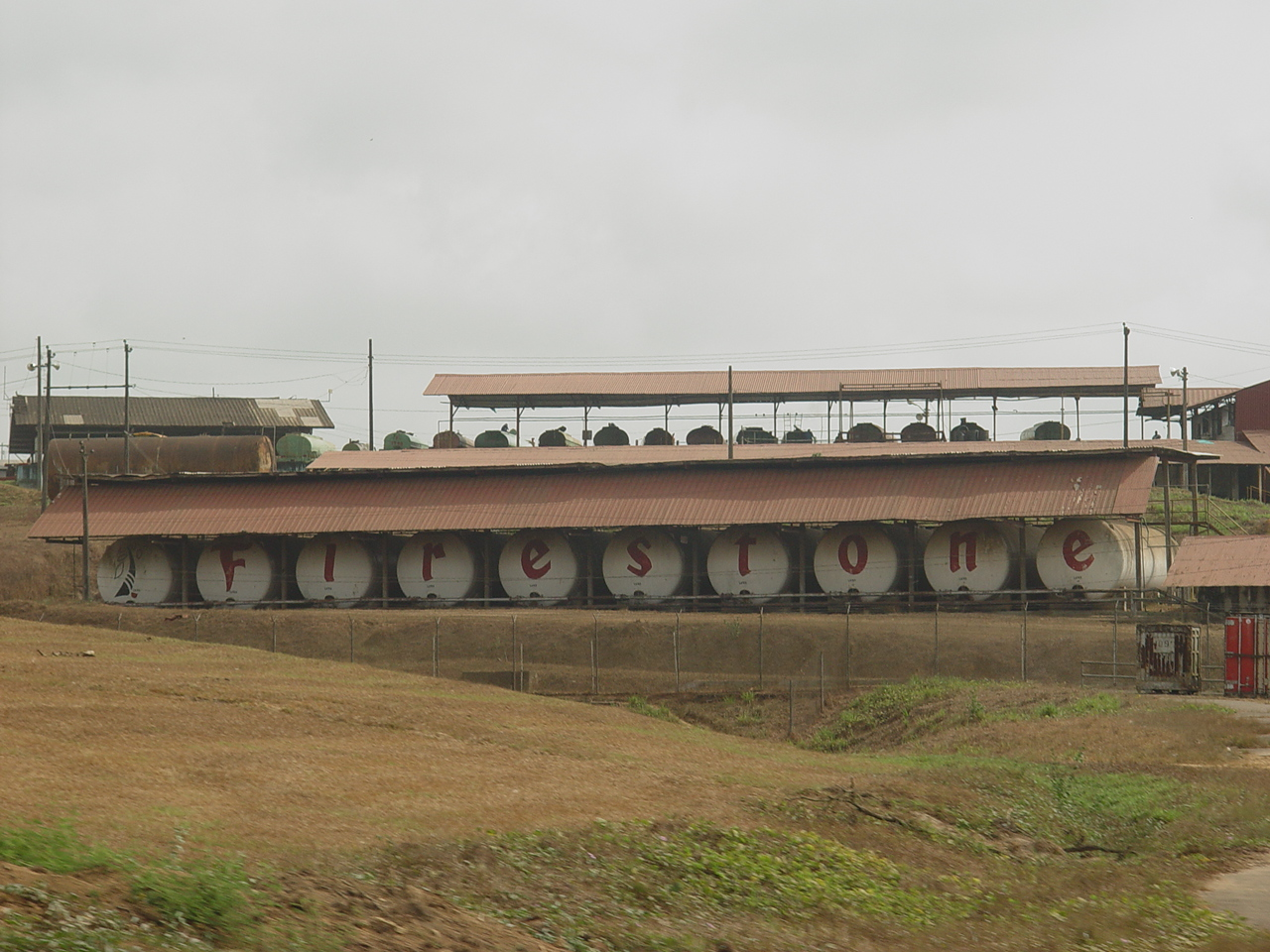
- Firestone Natural Rubber Company factory in Harbel, Liberia
- Type: Subsidiary
- Industry: Rubber
- Headquarters: Nashville, Tennessee, U.S
- Key people: Rick Burnett (CEO)
- Owner: Bridgestone Americas, Inc
- Website: Firestonenaturalrubber.com

Firestone Natural Rubber Company, LLC is a subsidiary of the Bridgestone Americas, Inc. Headquartered in Nashville, Tennessee, the company operates the largest contiguous rubber farm in the world in Harbel, Liberia, which first opened in 1926.

== History ==
=== Creation and early history ===
During the 1920s, the United States access to rubber was restricted by the European colonial powers (Britain and the Netherlands), which held a monopoly in rubber production. Herbert Hoover, then Secretary of Commerce, considered rubber a vital resource due to its usage for car tires and began working with American rubber companies in order to find a rubber source that was controlled by U.S. interests. Part of a Department of Commerce–subsidised worldwide search for a place for rubber plantations, rubber magnate Harvey Samuel Firestone sent experts to Liberia in December 1923 to do a soil survey.

In 1926, the Liberian government granted Firestone a 99–year lease for a million acres (to be chosen by the company wherever in Liberia) at a price of six cents per acre. Firestone then set about establishing rubber tree plantations of the non–native South American rubber tree, Hevea brasiliensis in the country, eventually creating the world's largest rubber plantation. As of 2005, Firestone plantations represented almost one-third of the land dedicated to rubber cultivation in Liberia.

The United States government was involved in the offshore rubber production operation from the outset, as scholar Christine Whyte point out: "The deal had the approval of the U.S. State Department, who hoped that the huge contract would keep Liberia within the American sphere of influence, without necessitating direct governmental control. The last–minute addition of a twenty–five million dollar loan attached to the concession was intended to ensure that American corporate influence dominated."

Establishing the plantations displaced many people and brought significant changes to local settlements. Residents of Harbel in Margibi County were forced to relocate to nearby Grand Bassa County. The displaced were not adequately compensated for their losses and continue to face uncertainty regarding land tenure. Their new settlement has the Bassa name Queezahn. Quee means “white” or “civilized,” while Zahn translates to “leave this place.” Similar displacement occurred in parts of Division 22, where residents had to move or risk being forced out by controlled burns. In 1929, the Liberian legislature received a complaint from King Maya Gedebeo of Twansiebo that, in addition to destroying nine towns in the area, the Firestone project made people "choose between forced labor and emigration." In addition to agricultural land itself, Firestone infrastructure required additional clearing. In a 1941 agreement with the United States Government, Firestone imported caterpillar tractors and bulldozers to clear 25,000 acres of land along the Farmington River for the construction of Liberia's first airport, now Roberts International Airport. Firestone constructed hangars, ancillary buildings, and an 8,700 foot runway on the site.

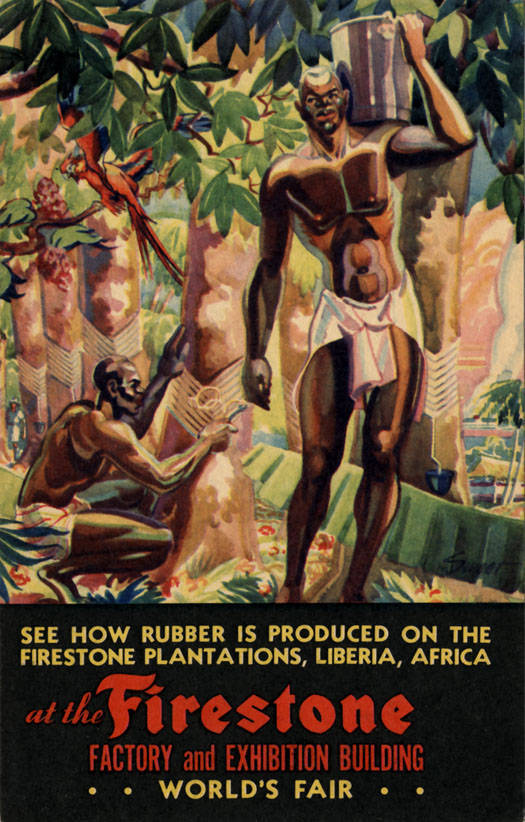
Advertisement for Firestone's factory and exhibition building at the World's Fair showing Liberians harvesting and transporting rubber

The Firestone Plantation was originally envisioned for 350,000 people to be employed on the newly created plantations. However this was more than the number of able–bodied men in the entire nation at the time, which created intense pressure for labor. As early as May 1925 British officials in Monrovia informed their superiors in London of how unfeasible these numbers were and warned that "natives would soon be converted into wage-slaves..." The Liberian government supplied men to create and staff the plantations by giving local chieftains quotas for workers that were impossibly high to meet. Among the men contracted by Firestone, Allen Yancey notoriously coerced men to prepare land in Maryland county for the plantations without pay.

As a part of the agreement with Firestone, the Liberian government was given funding to pay the foreign debts it had incurred, and to develop a harbor necessary for rubber exportation. In return for a $5 million loan at a 7% interest rate, Firestone was given complete authority over Liberian revenues until it was repaid. Over time the loan took a larger and larger portion of government income: it grew from 20% of the total revenue of Liberia in 1929, to 32% in 1930, to 55% in 1931 and nearly the whole revenue in 1932. A member of the American Legation in Liberia estimated that Liberia effectively paid a 17% interest rate on the loan.

Scholar Christine Whyte describes the Firestone plantation model in Liberia that emerged in the late–1920s and 1930s as a blatant, "export of the “company town” model from Ohio to Liberia. These towns were intended to not just provide worker housing, but also allowed the company to oversee many aspects of employees’ lives. Firestone controlled education, the judicial system, and health–care provision in the villages established on or near plantations."

Firestone made efforts to foster the development of Liberia's local rubber industry. Firestone employees distributed pamphlets, conducted soil surveys, and provided credit for harvesting materials to local producers. They also supplied seedlings and high-yielding budded trees. Still, Firestone remained the sole purchaser of rubber in Liberia until the mid 1950s, exerting significant control over the Liberian economy as a result. Additionally, the ownership of native Liberian rubber production predominantly resides with a small group of individuals who control the majority of the productive land. These producers typically have America-Liberian rather than tribal heritage and are drawn from the Liberian ruling class.

During the Great Depression, as rubber price fell, Firestone stopped its development of the plantation (using just 50,000 acres and cutting wages in half), and, depriving the Liberian government of tax incomes, the government missed a loan payment to the company. Firestone asked the U.S. government to send a warship to Monrovia to enforce the debt payment, but President Franklin D. Roosevelt rejected the "gunboat diplomacy".

During the 1940s workers began to protest their low wages, dangerous working conditions and inadequate housing provided by Firestone. In the period between 1926 and 1946 Christine Whyte concluded that:

"The collusion between Firestone and government officials to keep wages low and coerce workers onto the plantations was at best substantially overlooked, at worst regarded as a form of 'development' in itself."

The Firestone loan was finally paid off in 1952.

=== Journey Without Maps (1936) ===
In Journey Without Maps, Graham Greene's 1936 chronicle of his four month journey in Liberia, Greene describes Firestone as: "a commercial company with no interests in Liberia but rubber and dividends," adding that, "no one could really tell whether that labour was voluntary or forced." Greene also highlights the Firestone plantation hierarchy: "at the end of several hours’ rough driving from the capital, live the Firestone men in houses containing shower baths and running water and electric light, with a wireless station, tennis courts and a bathing pool, and a new neat hospital in the middle of plantations which smell all the day through of latex, as it drips into little cups tied beneath incisions in the trunks. They, more than the English or the French, are the official Enemy, and no story of whipping post, smuggled arms or burnt villages is too wild to be circulated and believed among Liberians of both parties."

=== Firestone-Smithsonian Expedition (1940) ===
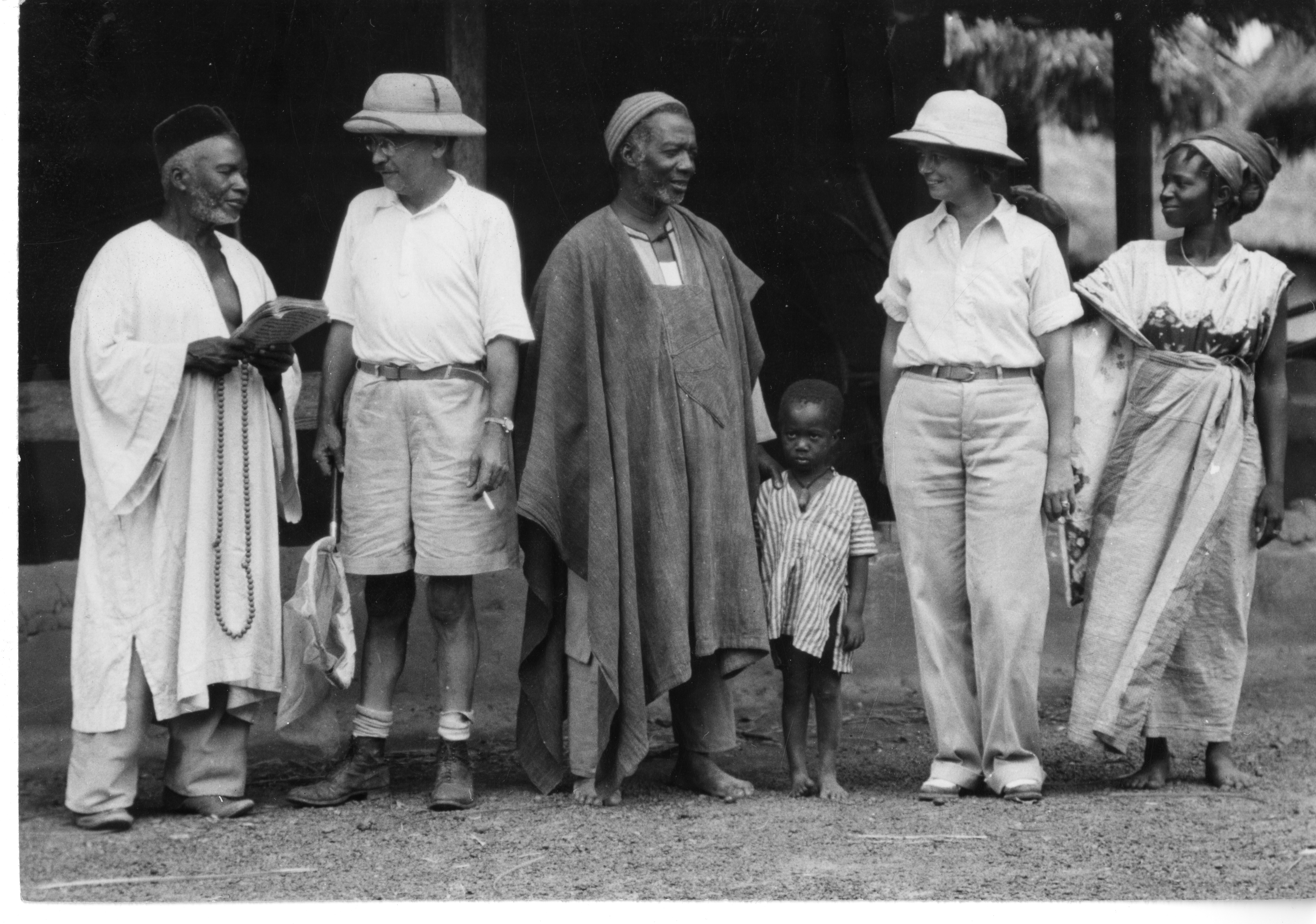
Pith-helmeted Americans William M. Mann (1886–1960) and Lucile Quarry Mann (1897–1986) on the 1940 Firestone-Smithsonian Expedition to Liberia, pictured with Boima Quae and child (center), Fermeteh (far right), and an unidentified person (far left).

In February 1940 the Firestone Tire and Rubber Company financed a 4 1/2 month expedition led by director of the Smithsonian Institution's National Zoological Park, William M. Mann (and his wife Lucile Quarry Mann), to collect specimens of animals and other flora. The Manns' account details that, "during the hotter part of the day one rides in a hammock, which is fastened to a frame and carried on the heads of four boys" and photographs taken by the Manns depict this mode of transport. The Smithsonian Institution Archives have digitized and made Lucile Quarry Mann's "Diary: Firestone Expedition to Liberia, 1940 (February 15 – August 8, 1940)" detailing the trip available online. In 1999 the National Film Preservation Foundation funded the Smithsonian's preservation of color home movies of the expedition, which are also available online.

=== During the civil wars ===
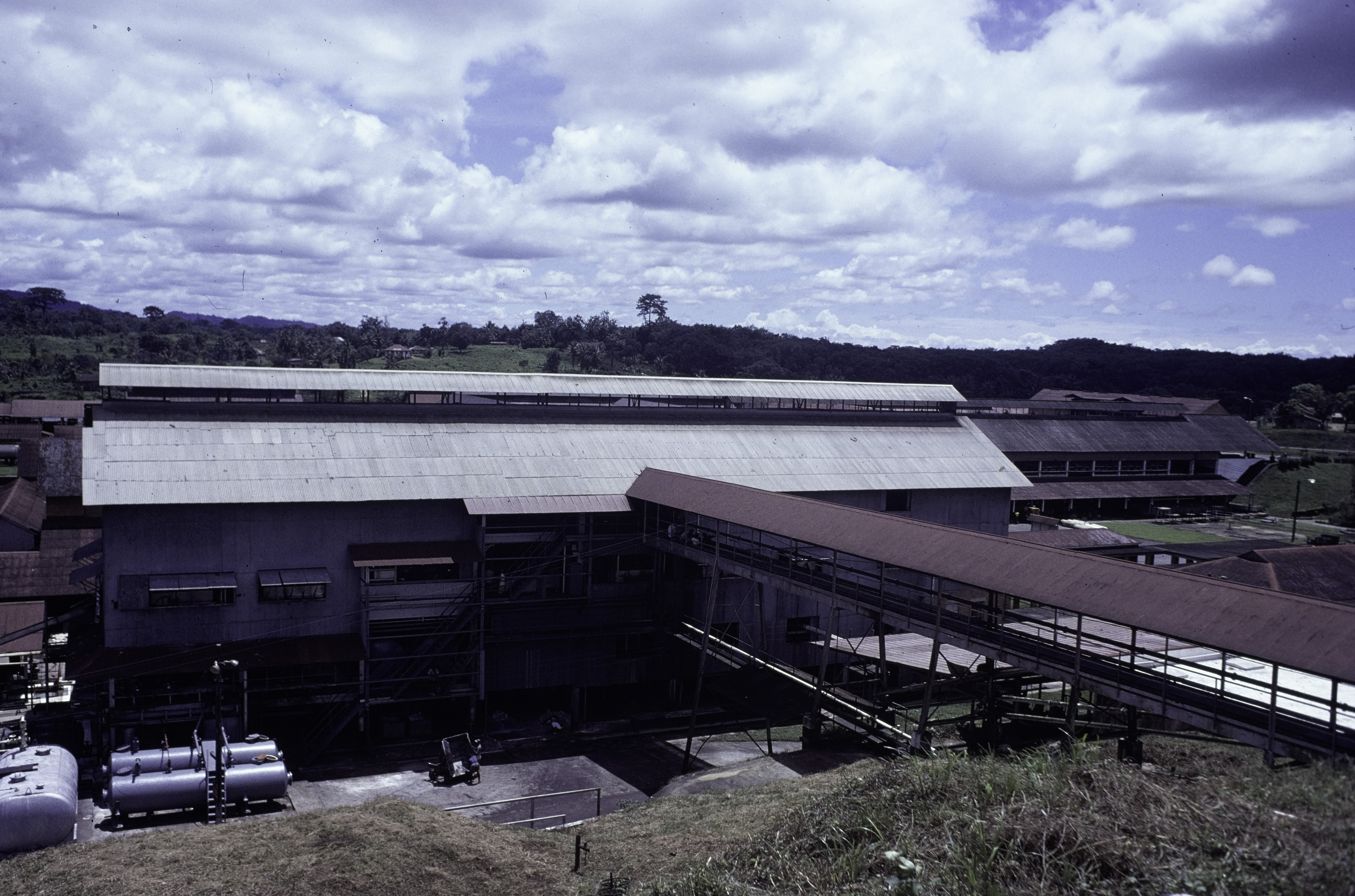
Firestone Natural Rubber latex factory in Harbel, Margibi County.

As rubber demand went down during the 1980s, Firestone dismissed a number of 5000 workers, leading to the local antipathy to the company. On June 6, 1990, during the First Liberian Civil War, the resistance group National Patriotic Front of Liberia took over the Firestone plantation and evacuated U.S. personnel. The exact nature of Firestone's activities in the plantation between 1990 and 1997 is unclear, the government's official stance was that they were able to take it back within a few months, while media reports say that it was not operational until late 1994.

American writer Denis Johnson reported two lengthy stories about the Liberian civil wars in the 1990s: "The Civil War in Hell" appeared in the December 1990 issue of Esquire, and "The Small Boys Unit" (which chronicles an aborted December 1992 New Yorker profile of Charles Taylor) was published in the October 2000 issue of Harper's Magazine. In the latter chronicle, republished in a 2001 collection of essays by HarperCollins, Johnson is held prisoner by Taylor on the Firestone plantation, describing it, thus: "a realm of tall rubber trees. Cool suffused light and perfect little golf–course gravel roads, the Firestone rubber plantation, one million acres of tall slender trees. [...] a square mile or more of groomed lawns with a few buildings scattered across them like toys. [...] I resided in the great house of a plantation so vast it constituted a region known on the maps simply as "Firestone." " Johnson provides first–hand details of an aerial attack upon Firestone's Harbel village, likely bombed by Economic Community Cease–Fire Monitoring Group (ECOMOG) of the ECOWAS as had already been perpetrated in November of 1992.

In 1997, after the violence was over, the company restarted the operations, at first at a third of capacity, with 3000 workers. The company soon faced a number of violent protests, as its employees wanted better working conditions, better pay and resettlement benefits. By October 2008, it was operating at half the capacity, withholding further investments until the government finally agreed to give the company a lenient tax status.

=== Current operations ===
In 2005, the Firestone Company and the Liberian government signed a new 37–year deal raising the lease to 50 cents per acre.

== Labor controversies ==
Liberian Firestone workers accuse the company of serious labor abuses, including exploitative child labor, which they claim amount to modern–day slavery. Workers specifically claim that Firestone's high daily quotas force them to employ their own children, subjecting them to grueling and dangerous work conditions. In response to the claims, the president of Firestone Natural Rubber told a CNN interviewer that "each tapper will tap about 650 trees a day, where they spend perhaps a couple of minutes at each tree." As the network pointed out, this would add up to more than 21 hours of work per day.

In May 2006, the United Nations Mission in Liberia (UNMIL) released a report detailing the state of human rights on Liberia's rubber plantations. According to the report, Firestone managers in Liberia admitted that the company does not effectively monitor its own policy prohibiting child labor. UNMIL found that several factors contribute to the occurrence of child labor on Firestone plantations: pressure to meet company quotas, incentive to support the family financially, and lack of access to basic education.

=== Alien Tort Claims Act litigation (2005) ===
In November 2005, the International Labor Rights Fund, representing "tappers" (workers who extract latex from rubber trees) on the Liberian plantation, filed an Alien Tort Claims Act (ATCA) case in U.S. District Court in California against Bridgestone (parent company owning Firestone), alleging "forced labor, the modern equivalent of slavery", on the Firestone Plantation in Harbel, Liberia. The case is known as Flomo vs. Firestone Natural Rubber Company.

The lawsuit stated:

The Plantation workers allege, among other things, that they remain trapped by poverty and coercion on a frozen–in–time Plantation operated by Firestone in a manner identical to how the Plantation was operated when it was first opened by Firestone in 1926.

Firestone rejected these allegations, stating that the provided employment and pensions to thousands of Liberians, as well as healthcare, primary education, and training opportunities to employees and their children.

In reply to the charge of exploitative child labor, company management claimed that workers would bring their own children to assist them despite the company not endorsing such behavior. However, workers claimed that management's high daily quotas force them to bring their children to work as their only means of meeting quotas. Though Firestone had formally banned children from tapping trees, workers claimed the ban was not enforced. Firestone management said if children are found helping their parents, the employees are cancelled, and if necessary, disciplined. "We have very strict policies about our child labor. We do not hire anybody under 18 years of age, and we discourage parents from bringing their children to the fields with them."

During the litigation, in April 2006 Firestone was granted its request to transfer the case from California to Indianapolis, Indiana. Ultimately, Firestone won the case. As law professor Jessica Bergman Asbridge has noted, the ATCA is limited to "the worst forms of child labor", whereas this case was also demanding Firestone to reduce its quotas for workers so that they would not have to bring their children to comply. The court determined that this request was outside its authority established by the ACTA, which "does not provide a warrant to oversee labor practices all over the world." Still, Bergman suspectcs that this case represents a step in a longer process of the ACTA's ability to encourage multinational corporations (like Firestone) to improve their child labor practices.

=== United Nations Mission in Liberia report (2006) ===
In May 2006, the United Nations Mission in Liberia (UNMIL) released a report: "Human Rights in Liberia’s Rubber Plantations: Tapping into the Future".

According to the report, Firestone managers in Liberia admitted that the company does not effectively monitor its own policy prohibiting child labor. UNMIL found that several factors contribute to the occurrence of child labor on Firestone plantations: pressure to meet company quotas, incentive to support the family financially, and lack of access to basic education. The report also noted that workers' housing provided by Firestone has not been renovated since the houses were constructed in the 1920s and 1930s.

In response to the accusations of child labor and poor housing in the UN report, Dan Adomitis, President of Firestone Natural Rubber Company Liberia, stated:

Well, in addition to the devastation that 15 years of civil war has caused, I think you need to understand another point–during the 2003 fighting, we had thousands of refugees come to Harbel for the safety that it provided. When those people came, they occupied any open area of land that was available. They put up temporary housing made out of mud, out of bamboo, out of thatch, out of tarpaulin, out of corrugated steel. Anything that they could do to get shelter. And those conditions still exist. They are not Firestone housing, but they are on our property.... We have very strict policies about child labor. We do not hire anybody under 18 years of age, and we discourage parents from bringing their children to the fields with them. We have a program with the Ministry of Labor in Liberia to – and also the union that represents our employees–to educate parents about why they should not bring children with them into the field. And if we see incidents of this, we will cancel those employees, and if necessary, ultimately discipline them over such issue.

=== Center for International Policy report (2020) ===
Beginning in March 2019, the Washington, D.C. based Center for International Policy funded an investigation into alleged labor and environmental standards violations by Firestone in Liberia, culminating in publication of the February 2020 report, "A Bridge Too Far: Social and Environmental Concerns in Bridgestone's Liberian Rubber Plantation and a Plan for Remediation." The report details labor rights violations of Firestone's collective bargaining agreements with the Firestone workers union; Firestone's failure to honor pension payments for retired Firestone employees; and, Firestone's contamination of local watersheds resulting in elimination of fish and natural wildlife. Firestone parent company, Bridgestone, participated in the report's study.

== Environmental record ==
Firestone utilized controlled burns during the dry season and manual clearing with axes and saws during the rainy season to clear extensive areas of land for rubber cultivation. By early 1929, Firestone had cleared over 15,000 acres of land. They replaced native trees, including those with medicinal or ritualistic value such as the sasswood, red ironwood, and Cassipourea firestoneana trees, with meticulously arranged rows of rubber trees. Tapping operations commenced shortly thereafter, and by 1940, Firestone had achieved a production of over 7,000 tons of latex per year.

Dense forest with rows of Hevea brasiliensis at the Firestone Plantation in Harbel, Margibi County

Monoculture agriculture, as practiced on the Firestone Plantations, often leads to a reduction in biological diversity, altering the environment and facilitating the spread of insects and disease. During periods of heightened rubber demand, such as the Second World War, Firestone workers implemented intensive tapping techniques that proved particularly detrimental to the health of the trees. Similarly, during downturns in car production and tire replacement, the profitability of planting and exporting rubber diminished. In the wake of the Great Depression, thousands of acres on Firestone plantations were left untended, leading to fungal growth and root rot. The presence of uniform waterways and walking paths provided ideal conditions for the unchecked expansion of the black fly, Simulium yahense, and the parasitic worm, Onchocerca volvulus.

In 1934, a smallpox outbreak occurred at Plantation Number 2, prompting a team of doctors to initiate the vaccination of hundreds of workers Additionally, a yellow fever outbreak in Monrovia in the late 1920s heightened concerns among Firestone leadership. During this period, the Firestone plantation served as a sanctuary for white foreigners in the city seeking refuge from the illness. Workers, particularly those with domestic responsibilities, were regularly administered vaccines to mitigate the risk of infection of Firestone employees. Numerous doctors and medical professionals conducted tests to assess the effectiveness of vaccines among Liberian workers.

To facilitate clearing, tappers applied the herbicide 2,4,5-Trichlorophenoxyacetic acid, a substance that has since been phased out due to recognized health and environmental risks. Similarly, the fungicide captafol, extensively used during that period, has been discontinued in the United States since 1987 due to its carcinogenic properties. Captafol often spilled into and onto harvesting materials of Firestone workers. In 2005, residents living near Firestone Plantations alleged that chemical runoff from rubber production flowed into the Farmington River and prevented local use. Representatives from Firestone have denied these allegations.

== See also ==
- Corporate abuse
- Crisis management – Process by which an organization deals with a harmful emergency
- Wage slavery – Term criticizing labor exploitation
- Natural resource – Resources that exist without actions of humankinds
- Environmental justice – Social movement
- Fordlandia – District in Aveiro, Pará, Brazil
- Environment of Liberia
