= List of power stations in Liberia =

This article lists all power stations in Liberia.

== Hydroelectric ==
Hydroelectric station	Type	Capacity	Year completed	Reservoir	River
Mount Coffee Power Station	Reservoir	88 MW	1966 (rehabilitated 2016)	St Paul Reservoir	Saint Paul River
Firestone Power Station		4.8 MW	1942		Farmington River

== Thermal ==
Thermal power station	Fuel type	Capacity	Year completed	Owner	Notes
LEC Bushrod Island Generating Station	Heavy fuel oil	38 MW (2 x 9 MW, 4 x 5 MW)	2016	Liberia Electric Company	6.362385°N 10.788558°W

== See also ==
- Energy in Liberia
- List of power stations in Africa
