= Mecistocephalus siaronus =

Scientific classification
- Kingdom: Animalia
- Phylum: Arthropoda
- Subphylum: Myriapoda
- Class: Chilopoda
- Order: Geophilomorpha
- Family: Mecistocephalidae
- Genus: Mecistocephalus
- Species: M. siaronus

Binomial name
- Mecistocephalus siaronus (Chamberlin, 1920)

Synonyms
- Ectoptyx siaronus Chamberlin, 1920

Species of centipede

Mecistocephalus siaronus is a species of soil centipede in the Mecistocephalidae family. This centipede is found in Fiji. This species has 49 pairs of legs and can reach 90 mm in length.

== Discovery and distribution ==
The species was first described in 1920 by American myriapodologist Ralph Vary Chamberlin. He based the original description of this species on a holotype and paratypes found by the American zoologist William M. Mann at Saiaro on the island of Viti Levu in Fiji. Three specimens including the holotype and a paratype are deposited in the Museum of Comparative Zoology at Harvard University. This species is known only from Fiji.

== Taxonomy ==
Chamberlin originally described this species under the name Ectoptyx siaronus. In 1929, the Austrian myriapodologist Carl Attems deemed Ectoptyx to be a subgenus in the genus Mecistocephalus. In 2003, authorities deemed Ectoptyx to be a junior synonym of Mecistocephalus. Authorities now consider Mecistocephalus to be the valid name for Ectoptyx.

== Description ==
This species has 49 leg pairs and can reach 90 mm in length. The surface of the body is brownish with a network of black pigment, whereas the head and forcipules are chestnut. The head is almost 1.75 times longer than wide. The areolate area on the anterior part of the clypeus does not feature a smooth spot in the middle. The middle piece of the labrum is almost three times as long as its maximum width. The mandible features 16 or 17 lamellae, with 19 teeth on the first lamella and about 42 teeth on a middle lamella. The distal teeth on the first lamella are only slightly longer than the proximal teeth. The inner margin of the mandible below the first lamella is smooth.

The first article of the forcipules feature two teeth, with the distal tooth larger than the proximal tooth. The teeth on the second and third articles are rounded. The ultimate article of the forcipule features a small rounded tooth. The groove on the sternites is forked with long branches forming obtuse angles. The sternite of the last leg-bearing segment is narrower at the posterior end and features notches on the lateral margins. The basal elements of the ultimate legs feature numerous small pores.

This species exhibits many traits that characterize the genus Mecistocephalus. For example, as in other species in this genus, the head is evidently longer than wide, and the sternites of the trunk segments feature a groove. Furthermore, like most species in this genus, this species features 49 leg-bearing segments. Moreover, as in many species in this genus, the first article of the forcipule in this species features not only a distal tooth but also a more proximal tooth.

This species shares a more extensive set of traits with another species in this genus, M. somonus, which is also found in Fiji. For example, in each of these two species, the inner corner of the posterior margin of each of the side pieces of the labrum forms an acute angle and extends far beyond the lateral part of this margin. Furthermore, in each of these species, the lamellae of the mandible feature teeth all the way down to the base. Authorities placed both of these species in the taxon Ectoptyx, first proposed as a genus, then later deemed a subgenus, based on these features of the labrum and the mandibles. Moreover, in each of these species, the areolate part of the clypeus lacks a smooth spot in the middle, the groove on the sternites is forked with the branches forming an obtuse angle, and the basal elements of the ultimate legs feature numerous small pores.

The species M. siaronus can be distinguished from M. somonus, however, based on other traits. For example, the mandible features more lamellae in M. siaronus (with 16 or 17 lamellae) than in M. somonus (with only 11 lamellae). Furthermore, the inner margin of the mandible below the first lamella is serrated in M. somonus but smooth in M. siaronus. Moreover, the middle piece of the labrum is narrower in M. siaronus (almost three times as long as wide) than in M. somonus (only about 2.3 times as long as wide).
