= Mecistocephalus labasanus =

Scientific classification
- Kingdom: Animalia
- Phylum: Arthropoda
- Subphylum: Myriapoda
- Class: Chilopoda
- Order: Geophilomorpha
- Family: Mecistocephalidae
- Genus: Mecistocephalus
- Species: M. labasanus

Binomial name
- Mecistocephalus labasanus (Chamberlin, 1920)

Synonyms
- Ectoptyx labasanus Chamberlin, 1920

Species of centipede

Mecistocephalus labasanus is a species of soil centipede in the Mecistocephalidae family. This centipede is found in Fiji. This species has 49 pairs of legs and can reach about 55 mm in length.

== Discovery and distribution ==
This species was first described in 1920 by American myriapodologist Ralph Vary Chamberlin. He based the original description of this species on four specimens found by the American zoologist William M. Mann in Fiji. Mann found the holotype in Nagasu, two paratypes in Labasa, and the other paratype in Suene. All four type specimens are deposited in the Museum of Comparative Zoology at Harvard University. This species is known only from Fiji.

== Taxonomy ==
Chamberlin originally described this species under the name Ectoptyx labasanus. In 1929, the Austrian myriapodologist Carl Attems deemed Ectoptyx to be a subgenus in the genus Mecistocephalus. In 2003, authorities deemed Ectoptyx to be a junior synonym of Mecistocephalus. Authorities now consider Mecistocephalus to be the valid name for Ectoptyx.

== Description ==
This species can reach about 55 mm in length and has 49 leg pairs. The surface of the body is brownish with a network of black pigment, whereas the head and forcipules are chestnut. The head is about 1.6 times longer than wide. The dorsal surface of the head features a frontal suture, and the posterior margin is almost straight but slightly convex. The areolate area on the anterior part of the clypeus is longer than the two smooth areas in the posterior part. A small smooth spot appears in the middle of this areolate area. The middle piece of the labrum is nearly twice as long as its maximum width. The mandible features 14 lamellae, with 18 to 20 teeth on the first lamella and about 37 teeth on a middle lamella. The distal teeth on the lamellae are much longer than the proximal teeth. The anterior corners of the coxosternite of the first maxillae are pointed and extend forward.

The first article of the forcipule features two teeth, a small proximal tooth and a much larger distal tooth. These teeth are shaped like cones with narrow but rounded distal ends. The second and third articles each feature one tooth, and the base of the ultimate article features a nodule or tooth. The groove on the sternites is forked with the branches forming an obtuse angle. The sternite of the last leg-bearing segment is much narrower at the posterior end and features notches on the lateral margins. The basal elements of the ultimate legs feature numerous small pores.

This species exhibits many traits that characterize the genus Mecistocephalus. For example, as in other species in this genus, the head is evidently longer than wide, and the sternites of the trunk segments feature a groove. Furthermore, like most species in this genus, this species features 49 leg-bearing segments. Moreover, as in many species in this genus, the first article of the forcipule in this species features not only a distal tooth but also a more proximal tooth.

This species shares a more extensive set of traits with two other species in this genus, M. kabasanus and M. turucanus, which are also both found in Fiji. For example, in each of these three species, the inner corner of the posterior margin of each of the side pieces of the labrum forms an acute angle and extends far beyond the lateral part of this margin. Furthermore, in each of these species, the lamellae of the mandible feature teeth all the way down to the base. Authorities placed all three species in the taxon Ectoptyx, first proposed as a genus, then later deemed a subgenus, based on these features of the labrum and the mandibles. Moreover, in each of these species, the areolate part of the clypeus features a small smooth spot in the middle, the groove on the sternites is forked with the branches forming an obtuse angle, and the basal elements of the ultimate legs feature numerous small pores. The features of M. turucanus are similar enough to those of M. labasanus for Attems to suggest that M. turucanus may be a subspecies of M. labasanus.

The species M. labasanus can be distinguished from M. kabasanus and M. turucanus, however, based on other traits. For example, the mandible features more teeth in M. kabasanus (with 19 lamellae, 23 teeth on the first lamella, and about 55 teeth on a middle lamella) and fewer teeth in M. turucanus (with only 13 lamellae and about 18 or 19 teeth on each lamella) than in M. labasanus. Furthermore, the middle piece of the labrum is more stout in both M. kabasanus and M. turucanus (each with a length/width ratio of only about 1.5) than in M. labasanus. Moreover, the head is more stout in M. turucanus (with a length/width ratio of only about 1.4) than in M. labasanus, and the anterior corners of the first maxillae are more prominent, the teeth on the first article of the forcipule are shorter and broader, and the posterior end of the sternite of the last leg-bearing segment is broader in M. kabasanus than in M. labasanus.
