= Mecistocephalus turucanus =

Scientific classification
- Kingdom: Animalia
- Phylum: Arthropoda
- Subphylum: Myriapoda
- Class: Chilopoda
- Order: Geophilomorpha
- Family: Mecistocephalidae
- Genus: Mecistocephalus
- Species: M. turucanus

Binomial name
- Mecistocephalus turucanus (Chamberlin), 1920

Synonyms
- Ectoptyx turucanus Chamberlin, 1920

Species of centipede

Mecistocephalus turucanus is a species of soil centipede in the Mecistocephalidae family. This centipede is found in Fiji. This species has 49 pairs of legs and can reach 45 mm in length.

== Discovery and distribution ==
This species was first described in 1920 by American myriapodologist Ralph Vary Chamberlin. He based the original description of this species on a holotype found by the American zoologist William M. Mann at Turuca in Fiji. This holotype is deposited in the Museum of Comparative Zoology at Harvard University. This species is known only from Fiji.

== Taxonomy ==
Chamberlin originally described this species under the name Ectoptyx turucanus. In 1929, the Austrian myriapodologist Carl Attems deemed Ectoptyx to be a subgenus in the genus Mecistocephalus. In 2003, authorities deemed Ectoptyx to be a junior synonym of Mecistocephalus. Authorities now consider Mecistocephalus to be the valid name for Ectoptyx.

== Description ==
This species has 49 leg pairs and can reach 45 mm in length. The surface of the body is brownish with a network of black pigment, whereas the head and forcipules are chestnut. The head is only about 1.4 times longer than wide. A small smooth spot appears in the middle of the areolate area on the clypeus. The middle piece of the labrum is about 1.5 times as long as its maximum width. The mandible features 13 lamellae, with 19 teeth on the first lamella and about 18 teeth on a middle lamella. The distal teeth on the first lamella are longer than the proximal (posterior) teeth. The anterior corners of the coxosternite of the first maxillae are prominent and extend forward.

The first article of the forcipule features two teeth, a small proximal tooth and a much larger distal tooth. These teeth are shaped like cones with narrow but rounded distal ends. The second and third articles each feature one tooth, and the base of the ultimate article features a nodule or tooth. The groove on the sternites is forked with the branches forming an obtuse angle. The sternite of the last leg-bearing segment is distinctly narrower at the posterior end and features notches on the lateral margins. The basal elements of the ultimate legs feature numerous small pores.

This species exhibits many traits that characterize the genus Mecistocephalus. For example, as in other species in this genus, the head is evidently longer than wide, and the sternites of the trunk segments feature a groove. Furthermore, like most species in this genus, this species features 49 leg-bearing segments. Moreover, as in many species in this genus, the first article of the forcipule in this species features not only a distal tooth but also a more proximal tooth.

This species shares a more extensive set of traits with two other species in this genus, M. kabasanus and M. labasanus, which are also both found in Fiji. For example, in each of these three species, the inner corner of the posterior margin of each of the side pieces of the labrum forms an acute angle and extends far beyond the lateral part of this margin. Furthermore, in each of these species, the lamellae of the mandible feature teeth all the way down to the base. Authorities placed all three species in the taxon Ectoptyx, first proposed as a genus, then later deemed a subgenus, based on these features of the labrum and the mandibles. Moreover, in each of these species, the areolate part of the clypeus features a small smooth spot in the middle, the groove on the sternites is forked with the branches forming an obtuse angle, and the basal elements of the ultimate legs feature numerous small pores. The features of M. turucanus are similar enough to those of M. labasanus for Attems to suggest that M. turucanus may be a subspecies of M. labasanus.

The species M. turucanus can be distinguished from M. kabasanus and M. labasanus, however, based on other traits. For example, the mandible features fewer teeth in M. turucanus than in either M. labasanus (with 14 lamellae, 18 to 20 teeth on the first lamella, and about 37 teeth on a middle lamella) or M. kabasanus (with 19 lamellae, 23 teeth on the first lamella, and about 55 teeth on a middle lamella). Furthermore, the head is more stout in M. turucanus than in either M. kabasanus or M. labasanus, which each feature heads with a length/width ratio of about 1.6. Moreover, the middle piece of the labrum is more stout in M. turucanus than in M. labasanus (with a middle piece nearly twice as long as wide), and the posterior end of the sternite of the last leg-bearing segment is narrower in M. turucanus than in M. kabasanus.
