= Mecistocephalus kabasanus =

Scientific classification
- Kingdom: Animalia
- Phylum: Arthropoda
- Subphylum: Myriapoda
- Class: Chilopoda
- Order: Geophilomorpha
- Family: Mecistocephalidae
- Genus: Mecistocephalus
- Species: M. kabasanus

Binomial name
- Mecistocephalus kabasanus (Chamberlin, 1920)

Synonyms
- Ectoptyx kabasanus Chamberlin, 1920

Species of centipede

Mecistocephalus kabasanus is a species of soil centipede in the Mecistocephalidae family. This centipede is found in Fiji. This species has 49 pairs of legs and can reach about 75 mm in length.

== Discovery and distribution ==
This species was first described in 1920 by American myriapodologist Ralph Vary Chamberlin. He based the original description of this species on a holotype found by the American zoologist William M. Mann at Kabasa Lau in Fiji. This holotype is deposited in the Museum of Comparative Zoology at Harvard University. This species is known only from Fiji.

== Taxonomy ==
Chamberlin originally described this species under the name Ectoptyx kabasanus. In 1929, the Austrian myriapodologist Carl Attems deemed Ectoptyx to be a subgenus in the genus Mecistocephalus. In 2003, authorities deemed Ectoptyx to be a junior synonym of Mecistocephalus. Authorities now consider Mecistocephalus to be the valid name for Ectoptyx.

== Description ==
This species features 49 leg pairs and can reach about 75 mm in length and 3 mm in width. The surface of the body is brownish with a network of black pigment, whereas the head and forcipules are chestnut. A small smooth spot appears in the middle of the areolate area on the anterior part of the clypeus. The middle piece of the labrum is only slightly more than 1.5 times as long as its maximum width. The mandible features 19 lamellae, with 23 teeth on the first lamella and about 55 teeth on a middle lamella. The distal teeth on the lamellae are longer than the proximal teeth.

The first article of the forcipule features two teeth, with the distal tooth larger than the proximal tooth. These teeth are shaped like broad cones that are wider at the base than long. The second and third articles of the forcipule each feature a rounded tooth, with the tooth on the second article larger than the tooth on the third. The base of the ultimate article of the forcipule features a large rounded bulge. The groove on the sternites is forked at the anterior end, with the branches forming an obtuse angle. The sternite of the last leg-bearing segment is narrower at the posterior end and features notches on the lateral margins. The basal elements of the ultimate legs feature numerous small pores.

This species exhibits many traits that characterize the genus Mecistocephalus. For example, as in other species in this genus, the head is evidently longer than wide, and the sternites of the trunk segments feature a groove. Furthermore, like most species in this genus, this species features 49 leg-bearing segments. Moreover, as in many species in this genus, the first article of the forcipule in this species features not only a distal tooth but also a more proximal tooth.

This species shares a more extensive set of traits with two other species in this genus, M. labasanus and M. turucanus, which are also both found in Fiji. For example, in each of these three species, the inner corner of the posterior margin of each of the side pieces of the labrum forms an acute angle and extends far beyond the lateral part of this margin. Furthermore, in each of these species, the lamellae of the mandible feature teeth all the way down to the base. Authorities placed all three species in the taxon Ectoptyx, first proposed as a genus, then later deemed a subgenus, based on these features of the labrum and the mandibles. Moreover, in each of these species, the areolate part of the clypeus features a small smooth spot in the middle, the groove on the sternites is forked with the branches forming an obtuse angle, and the basal elements of the ultimate legs feature numerous small pores.

The species M. kabasanus can be distinguished from M. labasanus and M. turucanus, however, based on other traits. For example, the mandible features more teeth in M. kabasanus than in either M. labasanus (with only 14 lamellae, only 18 to 20 teeth on the first lamella, and only about 37 teeth on a middle lamella) or M. turucanus (with only 13 lamellae and only about 18 or 19 teeth on each lamella). Furthermore, the posterior end of the sternite of the last leg-bearing segment is broader in M. kabasanus than in either M. labasanus or M. turucanus. Moreover, the head is more stout in M. turucanus than in M. kabasanus, and the middle piece of the labrum is more stout, the anterior corners of the first maxillae are more prominent, and the teeth on the first article of the forcipule are shorter and broader in M. kabasanus than in M. labasanus.
