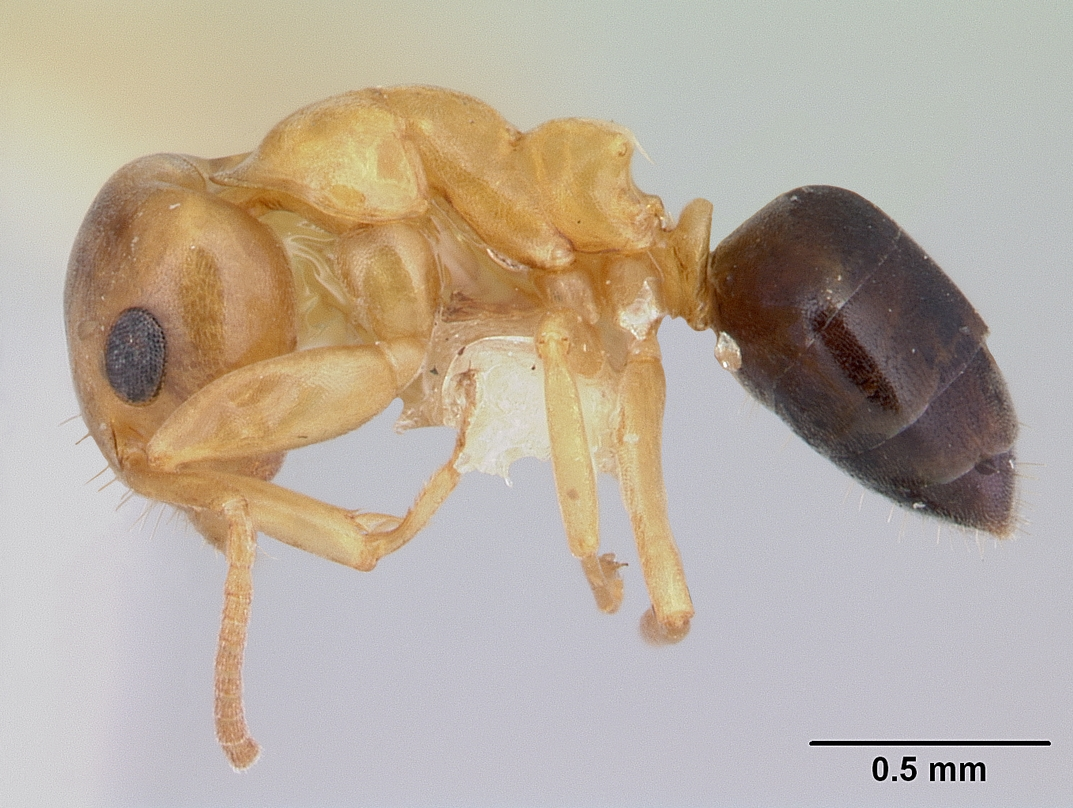

Scientific classification
- Domain: Eukaryota
- Kingdom: Animalia
- Phylum: Arthropoda
- Class: Insecta
- Order: Hymenoptera
- Family: Formicidae
- Subfamily: Dolichoderinae
- Genus: Turneria
- Species: T. pacifica

Binomial name
- Turneria pacifica W. M. Mann, 1919

= Turneria pacifica =

Species of ant

Turneria pacifica is a species of ant in the genus Turneria. Described by William M. Mann in 1919, the species is endemic to the Solomon Islands and Vanuatu.
