= Mecistocephalus somonus =

Scientific classification
- Kingdom: Animalia
- Phylum: Arthropoda
- Subphylum: Myriapoda
- Class: Chilopoda
- Order: Geophilomorpha
- Family: Mecistocephalidae
- Genus: Mecistocephalus
- Species: M. somonus

Binomial name
- Mecistocephalus somonus (Chamberlin, 1920)

Synonyms
- Ectoptyx somonus Chamberlin, 1920

Species of centipede

Mecistocephalus somonus is a species of soil centipede in the Mecistocephalidae family. This centipede is found in Fiji. This species has 49 pairs of legs and can reach 48 mm in length.

== Discovery and distribution ==
This species was first described in 1920 by American myriapodologist Ralph Vary Chamberlin. He based the original description of this species on a holotype found by the American zoologist William M. Mann in the village of Somosomo on the island of Taveuni in Fiji. This holotype is deposited in the Museum of Comparative Zoology at Harvard University. This species is known only from Fiji.

== Taxonomy ==
Chamberlin originally described this species under the name Ectoptyx somonus. In 1929, the Austrian myriapodologist Carl Attems deemed Ectoptyx to be a subgenus in the genus Mecistocephalus. In 2003, authorities deemed Ectoptyx to be a junior synonym of Mecistocephalus. Authorities now consider Mecistocephalus to be the valid name for Ectoptyx.

== Description ==
This species has 49 leg pairs and can reach 48 mm in length. The surface of the body is brownish with a network of black pigment, whereas the head and forcipules are chestnut. The head is about 1.6 times longer than wide. The areolate area on the anterior part of the clypeus is longer than the two smooth areas in the posterior part. The clypeus does not feature a smooth spot in the middle of this areolate area. The middle piece of the labrum is about 2.3 times as long as its maximum width. The mandible features 11 lamellae including two that are modified and reduced in size, with 19 teeth of almost uniform length on the first lamella and nearly 40 teeth on a middle lamella. The proximal teeth on a middle lamella are distinctly shorter than the distal teeth. The inner (anterior) margin of the mandible below the first lamella is finely serrate. The anterior corners of the coxosternite of the first maxillae are nearly right angles and barely protrude.

The teeth on the forcipules are short and rounded. The groove on the sternites is forked with the branches forming an obtuse angle, but the branches are short, shallow, and faint. The sternite of the last leg-bearing segment is narrower at the posterior end with notches on the lateral margins that are scarcely evident. The basal elements of the ultimate legs feature numerous small pores.

This species exhibits many traits that characterize the genus Mecistocephalus. For example, as in other species in this genus, the head is evidently longer than wide, and the sternites of the trunk segments feature a groove. Furthermore, like most species in this genus, this species features 49 leg-bearing segments.

This species shares a more extensive set of traits with another species in this genus, M. siaronus, which is also found in Fiji. For example, in each of these two species, the inner corner of the posterior margin of each of the side pieces of the labrum forms an acute angle and extends far beyond the lateral part of this margin. Furthermore, in each of these species, the lamellae of the mandible feature teeth all the way down to the base. Authorities placed both of these species in the taxon Ectoptyx, first proposed as a genus, then later deemed a subgenus, based on these features of the labrum and the mandibles. Moreover, in each of these species, the areolate part of the clypeus lacks a smooth spot in the middle, the groove on the sternites is forked with the branches forming an obtuse angle, and the basal elements of the ultimate legs feature numerous small pores.

The species M. somonus can be distinguished from M. siaronus, however, based on other traits. For example, the mandible features more lamellae in M. siaronus (with 16 or 17 lamellae) than in M. somonus (with only 11 lamellae). Furthermore, the inner margin of the mandible below the first lamella is serrated in M. somonus but smooth in M. siaronus. Moreover, the middle piece of the labrum is narrower in M. siaronus (almost three times as long as wide) than in M. somonus (only about 2.3 times as long as wide).
