= Mann's worm lizard =

Conservation status
- Least Concern (IUCN 3.1)

Scientific classification
- Kingdom: Animalia
- Phylum: Chordata
- Class: Reptilia
- Order: Squamata
- Clade: Amphisbaenia
- Family: Amphisbaenidae
- Genus: Amphisbaena
- Species: A. manni

Binomial name
- Amphisbaena manni Barbour, 1914

Species of amphisbaenian

Mann's worm lizard (Amphisbaena manni), also known commonly as the Hispaniolan dwarf wormlizard, is a species of amphisbaenian in the family Amphisbaenidae. The species is endemic to the island of Hispaniola. Its name reflects appearance, the mann's worm lizard being a tube-shaped worm like reptilian with pink skin and rings around the body.

== Etymology ==
The specific name, manni, is in honor of American entomologist William Montana Mann.

== Geographic range ==
Amphisbaena manni is found in the Dominican Republic and Haiti.

== Habitat ==
The preferred habitat of Amphisbaena manni is forest.

== Reproduction ==
Amphisbaena manni is oviparous.
