= Turneria dahlii =

Scientific classification
- Kingdom: Animalia
- Phylum: Arthropoda
- Class: Insecta
- Order: Hymenoptera
- Family: Formicidae
- Subfamily: Dolichoderinae
- Genus: Turneria
- Species: T. dahlii

Binomial name
- Turneria dahlii Forel, 1901

Species of ant

Turneria dahlii is a species of ant in the genus Turneria. Described by Auguste-Henri Forel in 1901, the species is endemic to New Guinea, the Solomon Islands and Vanuatu.
