= Mann's dwarf gecko =

Conservation status
- Least Concern (IUCN 3.1)

Scientific classification
- Kingdom: Animalia
- Phylum: Chordata
- Class: Reptilia
- Order: Squamata
- Suborder: Gekkota
- Family: Gekkonidae
- Genus: Lygodactylus
- Species: L. manni

Binomial name
- Lygodactylus manni Loveridge, 1928

Synonyms
- Lygodactylus manni Loveridge, 1928; Lygodactylus picturatus ukerewensis Loveridge, 1935; Lygodactylus manni — Kluge, 1993

Species of lizard

Mann's dwarf gecko (Lygodactylus manni) is a species of gecko, a lizard in the family Gekkonidae. The species is native to East Africa.

== Etymology ==
The specific name, manni, is in honor of William Montana Mann, who was an American entomologist and zoo director.

== Geographic range ==
Lygodactylus manni is found in southwestern Kenya and northern Tanzania.

== Habitat ==
The preferred natural habitat of Lygodactylus manni is savanna, at altitudes of 1,000–1,800 m (3,300–5,900 ft).

== Reproduction ==
Lygodactylus manni is oviparous.
