= Turneria postomma =

Scientific classification
- Domain: Eukaryota
- Kingdom: Animalia
- Phylum: Arthropoda
- Class: Insecta
- Order: Hymenoptera
- Family: Formicidae
- Subfamily: Dolichoderinae
- Genus: Turneria
- Species: T. postomma

Binomial name
- Turneria postomma Shattuck, 1990

Species of ant

Turneriapostomma is a species of ant in the genus Turneria. Described by Shattuck in 1990, the species is endemic to Papua New Guinea.
