= Turneria rosschinga =

Scientific classification
- Kingdom: Animalia
- Phylum: Arthropoda
- Class: Insecta
- Order: Hymenoptera
- Family: Formicidae
- Subfamily: Dolichoderinae
- Genus: Turneria
- Species: T. rosschinga

Binomial name
- Turneria rosschinga Shattuck, 2011

Species of ant

Turneria rosschinga is a species of ant in the genus Turneria. Described by Shattuck in 2011, the species is endemic to Australia.
