= Lepidodactylus manni =

Conservation status
- Vulnerable (IUCN 3.1)

Scientific classification
- Kingdom: Animalia
- Phylum: Chordata
- Class: Reptilia
- Order: Squamata
- Suborder: Gekkota
- Family: Gekkonidae
- Genus: Lepidodactylus
- Species: L. manni

Binomial name
- Lepidodactylus manni Schmidt, 1923

Species of lizard

Lepidodactylus manni, also known commonly as the Fiji scaly-toed gecko or the Viti forest gecko, is a species of gecko, a lizard in the family Gekkonidae. The species is endemic to Fiji.

== Etymology ==
The specific name, manni, is in honor of William Montana Mann, an American entomologist and zoo director.

== Description ==
Lepidodactylus manni has smooth upper labials, no enlarged internasal scale, and a tail that is round in cross section.

== Geographic range ==
Lepidodactylus manni is found on the following islands in Fiji: Kadavu, Rabi, and Viti Levu.

== Habitat ==
The preferred natural habitat of Lepidodactylus manni is forest.

== Reproduction ==
Lepidodactylus manni is oviparous. Clutch size is two eggs.
