= Turneria frenchi =

Scientific classification
- Kingdom: Animalia
- Phylum: Arthropoda
- Class: Insecta
- Order: Hymenoptera
- Family: Formicidae
- Subfamily: Dolichoderinae
- Genus: Turneria
- Species: T. frenchi

Binomial name
- Turneria frenchi Forel, 1911

Species of ant

Turneria frenchi is a species of ant in the genus Turneria. Described by Auguste-Henri Forel in 1911, it is endemic to Australia, but original specimens of the ant have been lost, and its placement in a genus has been in question. The ant has been transferred various times, notably being transferred to Stigmacros in 1990 but then put back into Turneria in 1992.
