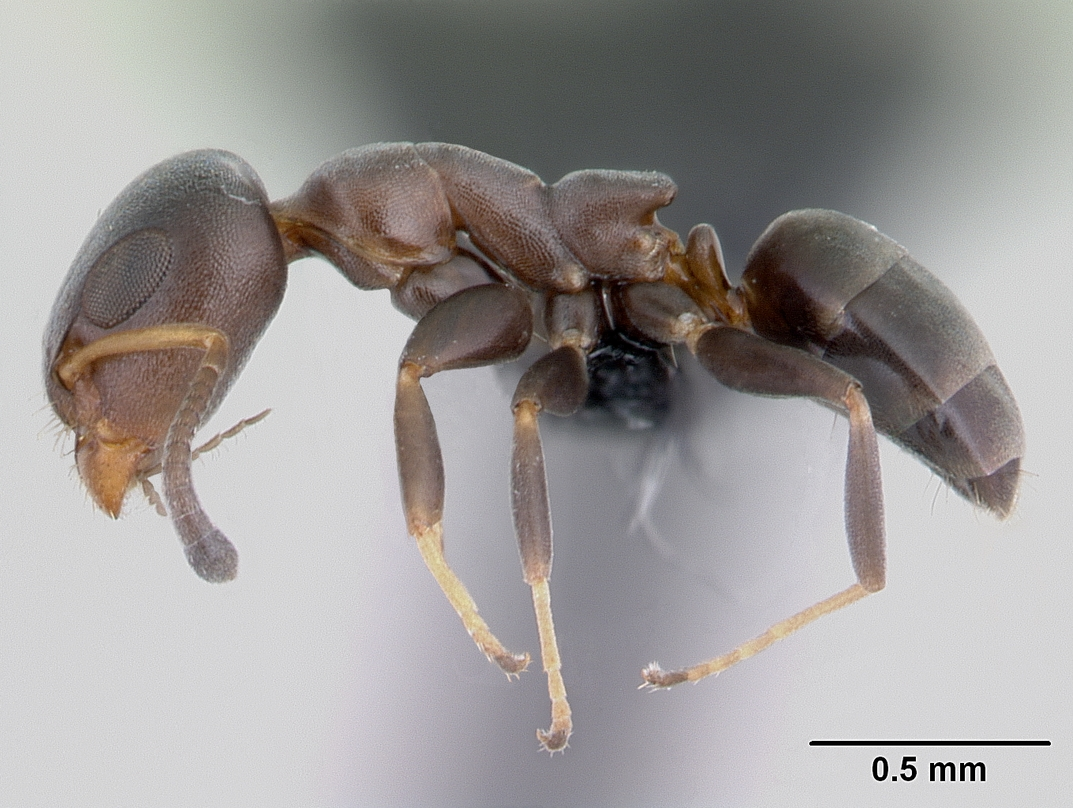

Scientific classification
- Kingdom: Animalia
- Phylum: Arthropoda
- Class: Insecta
- Order: Hymenoptera
- Family: Formicidae
- Subfamily: Dolichoderinae
- Genus: Turneria
- Species: T. bidentata

Binomial name
- Turneria bidentata Forel, 1895

= Turneria bidentata =

Species of ant

Turneria bidentata is a species of ant in the genus Turneria. Described by Auguste-Henri Forel in 1895, the species is endemic to Australia, mostly found in the north ends of the country.
