= Energy in Liberia =

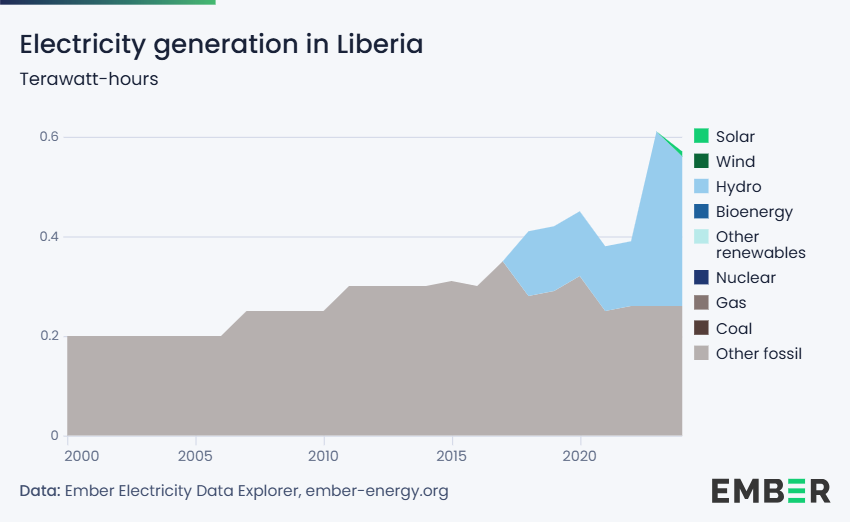
Electricity generation in Liberia in terawatt-hours

Grid electricity in Liberia is provided primarily by the state-owned Liberia Electricity Corporation (LEC), the national utility responsible for the generation, transmission, distribution, import, and sale of grid electricity. However, electricity services are no longer provided solely by LEC. As of 2024, the Liberia Electricity Regulatory Commission (LERC) also regulates other licensed operators, including Jungle Energy Power in parts of Bong and Nimba, LIBENERGY in parts of Nimba, Grand Gedeh, River Gee, and Maryland, ENERGICITY in parts of Gbarpolu, and the Totota Electric Cooperative in Bong County.

Electricity access in Liberia remains low but has improved in recent years. World Bank data show that access to electricity reached 32.5% of the population in 2023, including 52.7% in urban areas and 9.3% in rural areas.

Liberia's installed generation capacity was reported at 126 MW in 2024, consisting of 88 MW at the Mount Coffee Hydropower Plant and 38 MW at heavy fuel oil plants. Hydropower is the main source of supply, but generation at Mount Coffee declines during the dry season, contributing to recurring shortages and load shedding.

Liberia supplements domestic electricity generation through imports via the West African Power Pool (WAPP), primarily along the Côte d’Ivoire–Liberia–Sierra Leone–Guinea (CLSG) interconnection. Imported power reached approximately 35 MW in 2024 and has become a critical component of supply, particularly during the dry season.

Although tariffs remain high by regional standards, residential tariffs declined from approximately US$0.52/kWh in 2014 to about US$0.24/kWh in 2024.

== See also ==
- List of power stations in Liberia
- Liberia Electricity Corporation
