= Firestone Hydroelectric Power Station =

Hydroelectric power station in Liberia

Firestone Hydroelectric Project
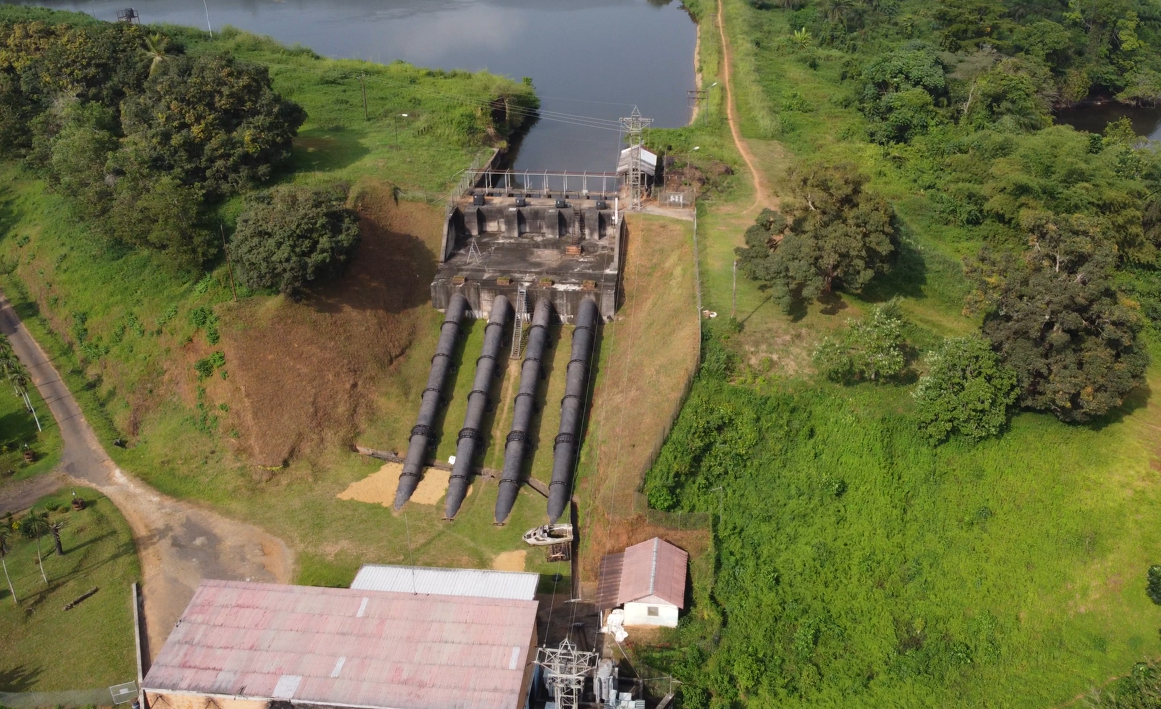
- Country: Liberia
- Location: Harbel, Margibi County, Liberia
- Coordinates: 6°17′51″N 10°18′08″W
- Status: Operational
- Commission date: 1942
- Owner: Firestone Plantations Company

Thermal power station
- Primary fuel: Hydropower

Power generation
- Units operational: 4
- Nameplate capacity: 4.8 MW (6,400 hp)

The Firestone hydroelectric power station is a hydroelectric power station in Liberia on the Farmington River. Built in 1942, it was the first power generating dam built in the country. Located in Harbel, Margibi County, it is operated by the Firestone Plantations Company.

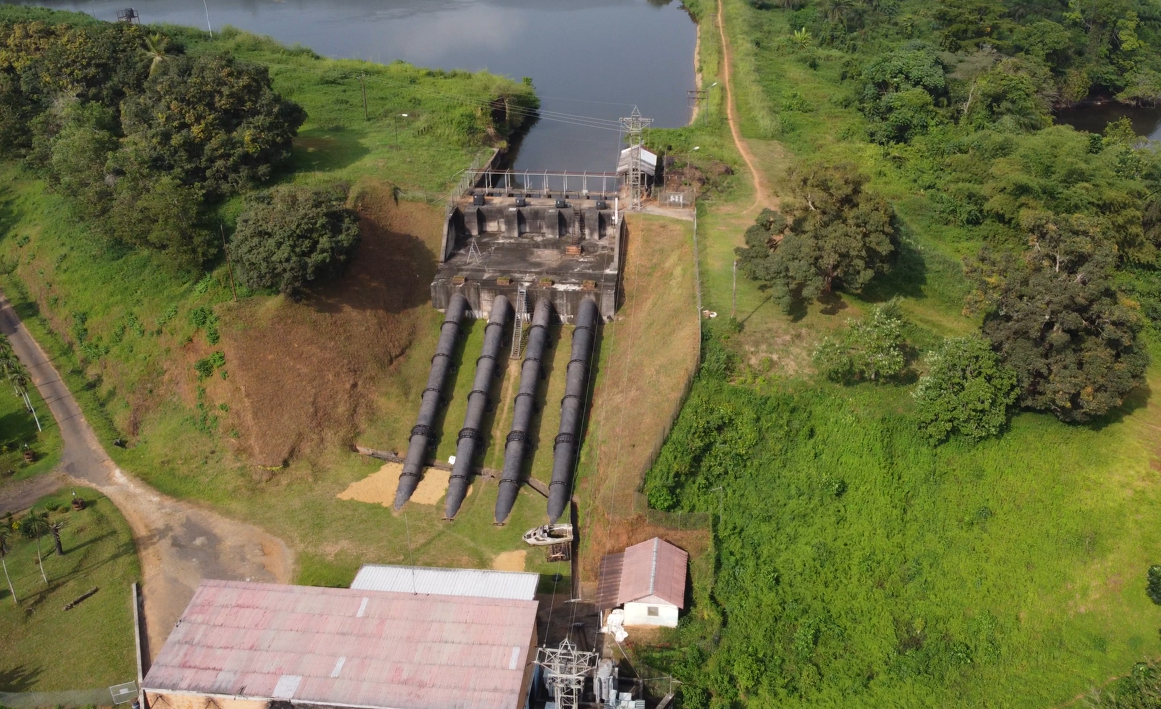

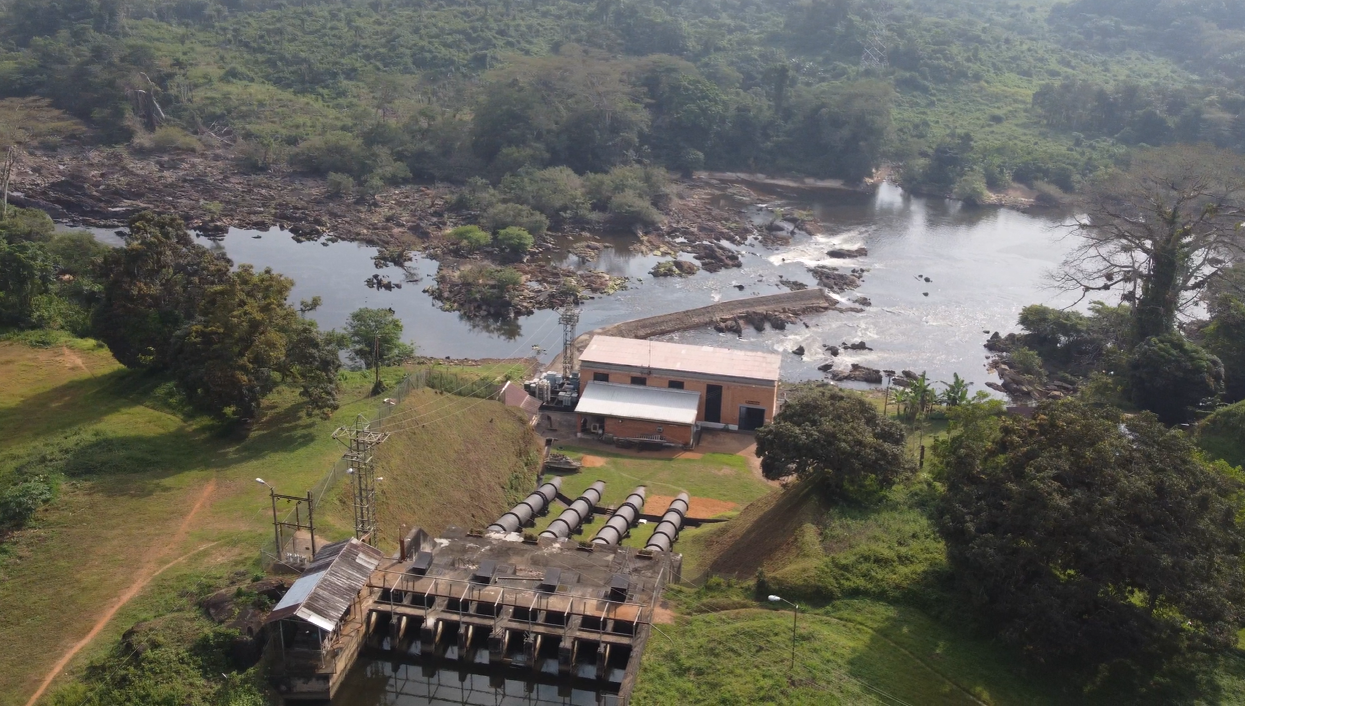

== Capacity ==
The project has a generating capacity of 64 megawatts (86,000 hp) produced by four turbines. Initial construction was in order to supply power to a United States military facility in the area during World War II and to supply the city of Robertsfield. The plant was the only hydro power facility to remain intact during the Civil Wars.
