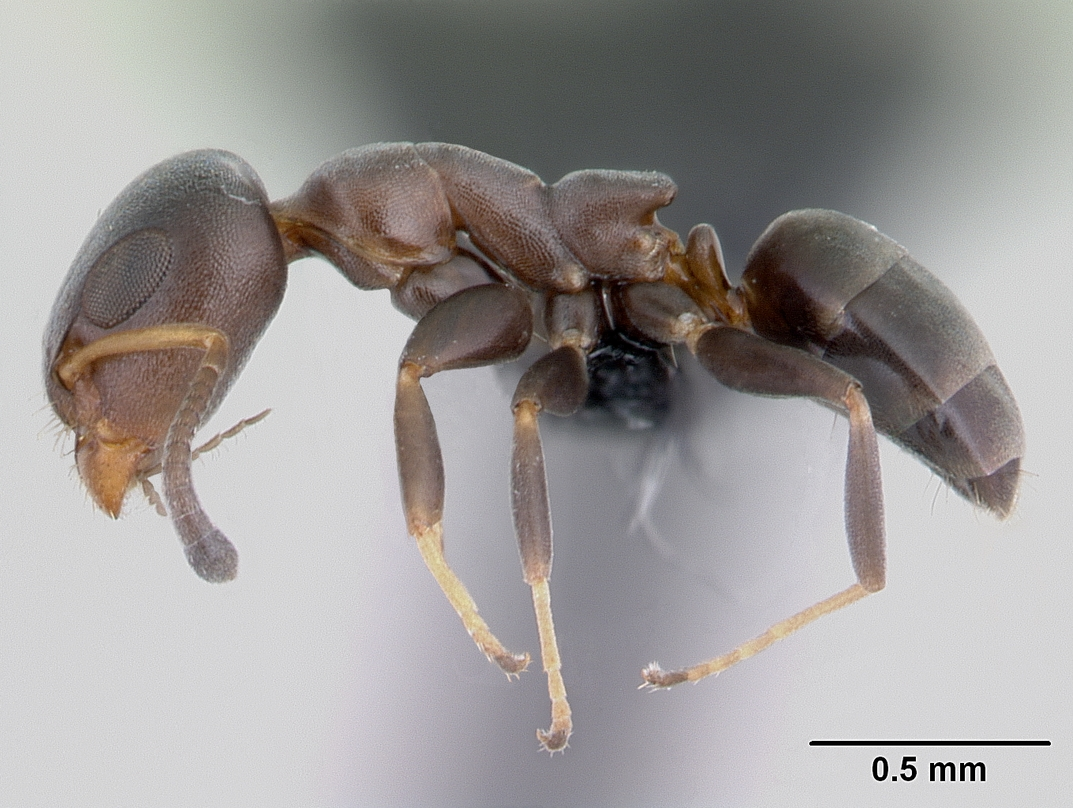
- Turneria bidentata worker

Scientific classification
- Kingdom: Animalia
- Phylum: Arthropoda
- Clade: Pancrustacea
- Class: Insecta
- Order: Hymenoptera
- Family: Formicidae
- Subfamily: Dolichoderinae
- Tribe: Leptomyrmecini
- Genus: Turneria; Forel, 1895

Type species
- Turneria bidentata

Diversity
- 8 species

= Turneria =

Genus of ants

Turneria is a genus of ants that belongs to the subfamily Dolichoderinae. Known from Australia, they form small colonies of fewer than 500 workers, and nest in trees and twigs.

== Species ==
- Turneria arbusta Shattuck, 1990
- Turneria bidentata Forel, 1895
- Turneria collina Shattuck, 1990
- Turneria dahlii Forel, 1901
- Turneria frenchi Forel, 1911
- Turneria pacifica Mann, 1919
- Turneria postomma Shattuck, 1990
- Turneria rosschinga Shattuck, 2011
