= Farmington River (Liberia) =

River in Liberia

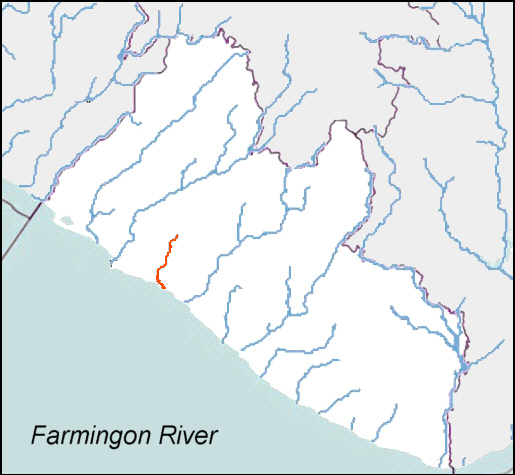

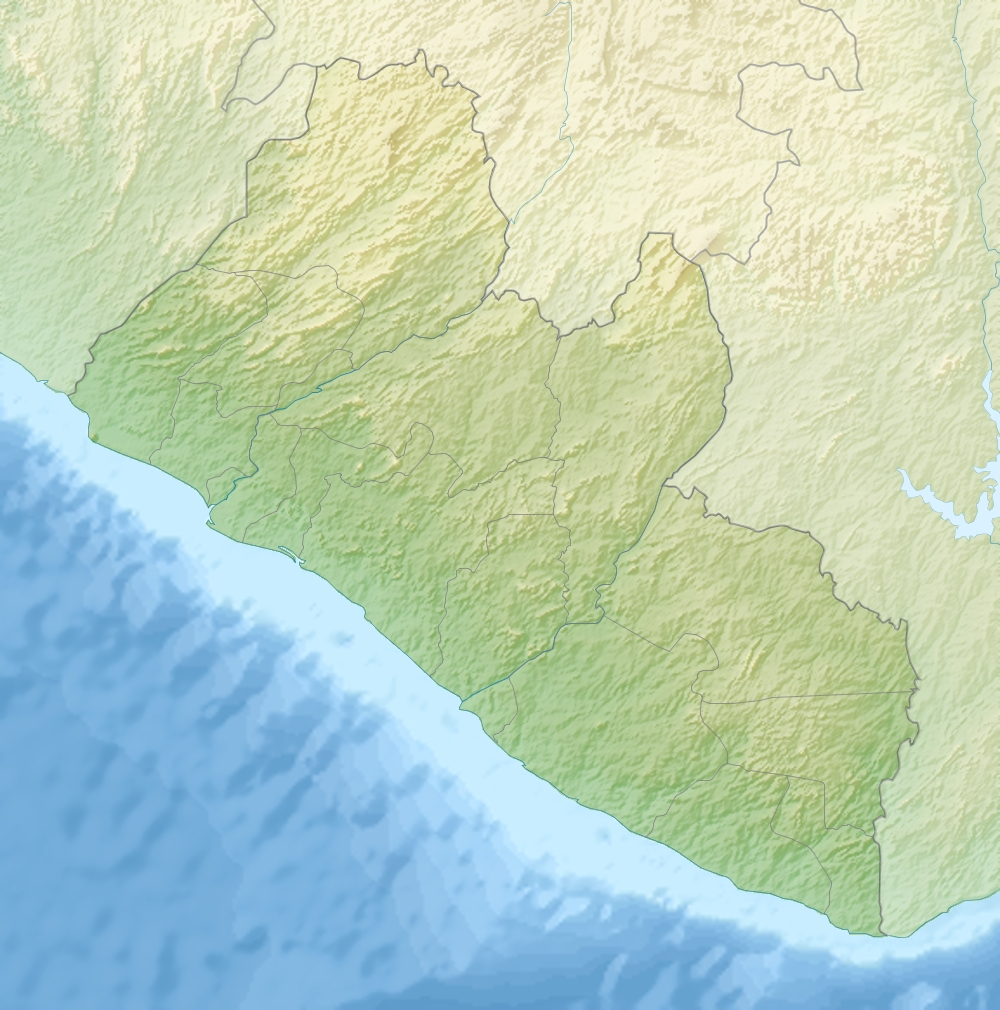
- Mouth of Farmington River in Liberia

Location
- Country: Liberia
- Cities: Harbel

Physical characteristics
- Source
  - location: Bong Range
- Mouth
  - location: North Atlantic Ocean
  - coordinates: 6.1308°N 10.3703°W
- Length: 120 km (75 mi)

Basin features
- Tributaries
  - right: Junk River (but see the text)
- Hydropower: Firestone hydroelectric power station

The Farmington River is a river in Liberia. It empties into the Atlantic Ocean near the town of Marshall.

The Farmington River, Junk River, and Gbage River join near the Atlantic coast to form an estuary. Some sources suggest that the river reaching the ocean is the Farmington River, whereas the Junk River is its tributary. Other, often older sources suggest the opposite.

Firestone Natural Rubber Company established rubber plantations by the Farmington River in 1926. The company built the Firestone hydroelectric power station, completed in 1942, to serve the plantation and the associated industry. In later years, the company has been accused of polluting the river.

Farmington River near the Firestone Plantation, Harbel, Margibi County (then Marshall County), Liberia, 1977-1978.
