= Lucile Quarry Mann =

American zoologist, writer and editor

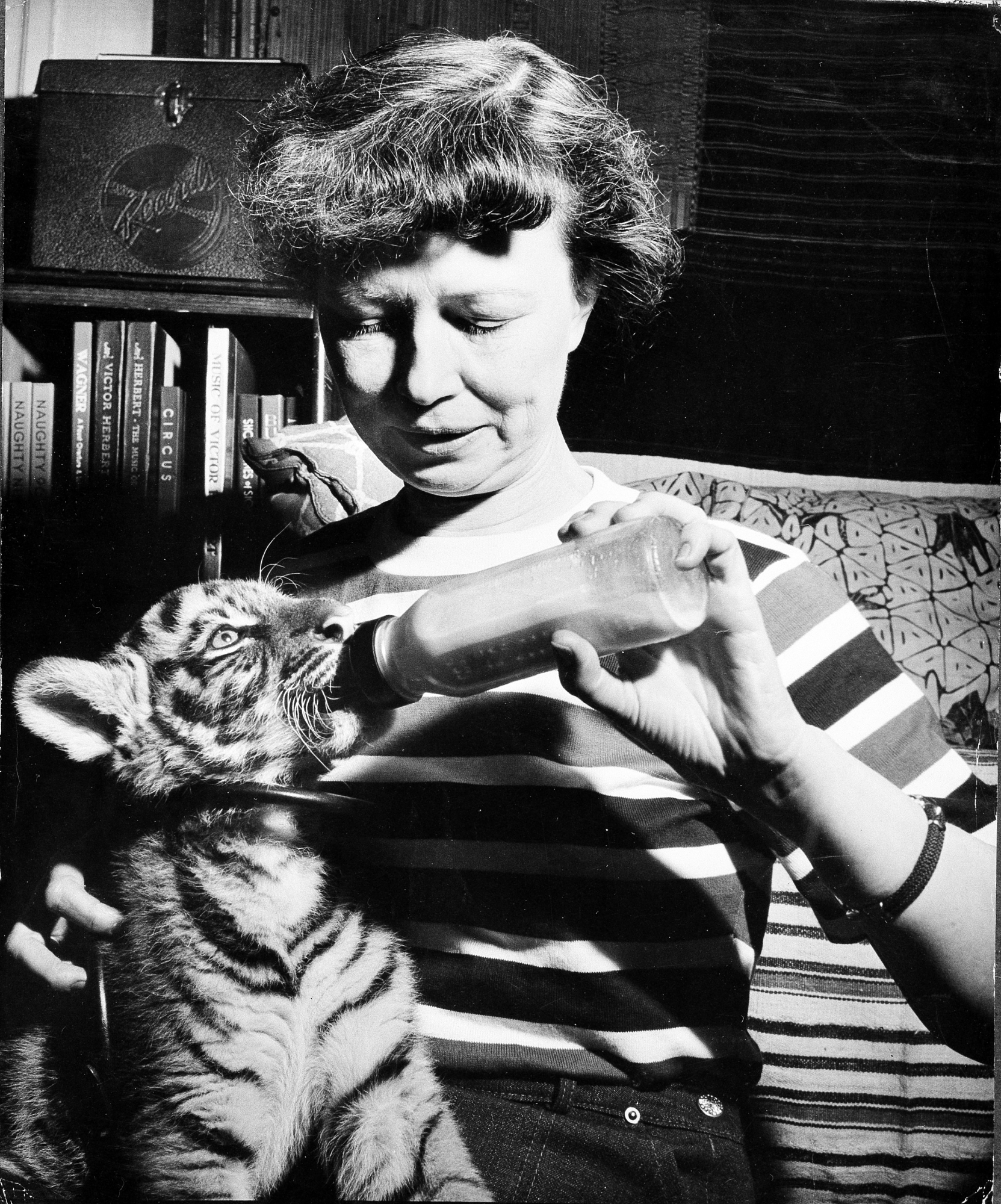
- Mann feeding a tiger cub in 1949
- Born: January 11, 1897; Ann Arbor, Michigan
- Died: November 27, 1986 (aged 89)
- Occupation: Writer, editor, and explorer
- Education: BA in English, 1919
- Alma mater: University of Michigan
- Subject: Travel, tropical fish, animals, zoos, animal care, the Smithsonian National Zoological Park
- Spouse: William M. Mann (m. 1926)

Lucile "Lucy" Quarry Mann (January 11, 1897 – November 27, 1986) was an American writer, editor, and explorer who worked for the Smithsonian's National Zoological Park in Washington, D.C. Mann was also the wife of William M. Mann, the director of the Smithsonian's National Zoological Park She traveled around the world with her husband, raised baby animals at home, authored several books, and worked to promote the Smithsonian and the National Zoo. Mann served as an editor for the National Zoo for fifteen years.

== Early life ==
Mann was born in Ann Arbor, Michigan. She graduated from the University of Michigan in 1919 with a BA in English. There, she worked on the student literary magazine The Inlander.

== Early career ==
Mann began her career during World War I, translating Italian newspapers and communiques for the US War Department. When the war ended in November 1919, Mann accepted a job as the assistant editor of the USDA's Bureau of Entomology. Mann left Washington, D.C. in 1922 and moved to New York City, where she became a junior editor at The Woman's Home Companion. In 1926, Lucy Quarry married William M. Mann and returned to Washington, D.C.

== Smithsonian years ==
As wife of the director of the Smithsonian's National Zoological Park, Mann assisted her husband by taking care of animals in their home, entertaining guests, and helping with administrative work. After writing an article about tropical fish that appeared in The Woman's Home Companion, Mann was asked to write a book. The resulting project was Tropical Fish: A Practical Guide for Beginners. Mann's zoo experience also inspired a second book, this one titled Friendly Animals: A Book of Unusual Pets.

Mann accompanied her husband on fact-finding trips to other zoos and field work expeditions around the world, including to Argentina, British Guiana, Liberia, and the East Indies. On one trip to Indonesia, they brought 900 animals (many of which found homes at the Maryland Zoo) back to Washington, D.C. Together, Lucile and William Mann traveled to countries on nearly every continent. Mann kept detailed field notes on every trip she took. Her third publication, From Jungle to Zoo: Adventures of a Naturalist's Wife, was informed by her travel journals. Mann also co-authored several lectures and scholarly articles with William Mann in the course of their travels.

In 1951, Mann began working with her husband in the administrative offices at the National Zoo. When William Mann retired in 1956, she continued to work at the zoo under the direction of Dr. Theodore Reed. From 1956 until her retirement in 1971, Mann was zoo editor, responsible for writing the Annual Report and other publications for the National Zoological Park.

From 1932 until her death in 1986, Mann was a member of the Society of Woman Geographers.

== Publications ==
- From Jungle to Zoo: Adventures of a Naturalist's Wife. New York: Dodd, Mead, and Company, 1934
- Friendly Animals: A Book of Unusual Pets. New York: Leisure League of America, 1935
- Tropical Fish: A Practical Guide for Beginners. Leisure League of America, 1934
