= Harbel =

Town in Margibi County, Liberia

- Location in Liberia
- Coordinates: 6°17′N 10°21′W
- Country: Liberia
- County: Margibi County

Population (2008)
  - Total: 25,309

A dirt road and houses near the Firestone natural rubber plantation in Harbel, Liberia

Harbel is a town in Margibi County, Liberia. It lies along the Farmington River, about 15 miles (24 km) upstream from the Atlantic Ocean. It was named for the founder of the Firestone Tire & Rubber Company, Harvey S. Firestone, and his wife, Idabelle. Since 1926, Harbel has been home to a vast natural rubber plantation which is still operated by the Firestone subsidiary of Bridgestone.

Roberts International Airport is 2 miles (3.2 km) southwest of Harbel.

As of the 2008 census, Harbel had a population of 25,309.

== See also ==
- Firestone Hydroelectric Project
