= Firestone (company) =

American tire company

Firestone Tire and Rubber Company

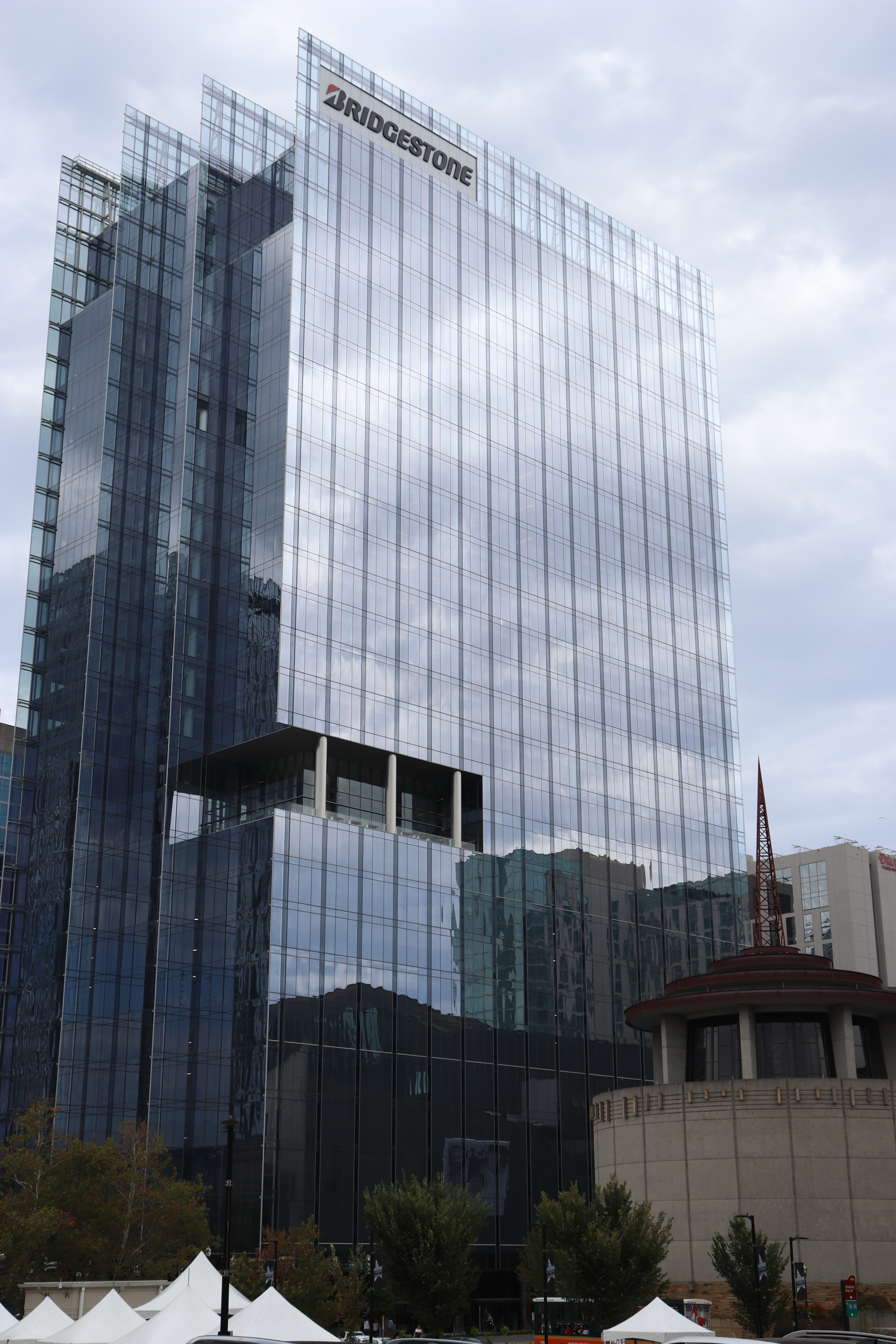
- Bridgestone Tower in Nashville, headquarters of Firestone and Bridgestone Americas
- Type: Subsidiary
- Traded as: NYSE: FS (1929–1988)
- Industry: Manufacturing
- Founded: August 3, 1900; 126 years ago Akron, Ohio, U.S.
- Founder: Harvey S. Firestone
- Headquarters: Akron, Ohio (1900–1987; 1989–1992); Chicago, Illinois (1987–1989); Nashville, Tennessee (1992–present)
- Number of locations: 1,700 repair shop locations
- Area served: Worldwide
- Key people: Paolo Ferrari; (CEO and president); Scott Damon (COO)
- Products: Tires
- Revenue: ▲ U.S.$2.09 billion (2004)
- Number of employees: 33,000
- Parent: Bridgestone
- Website: firestone.com

Firestone Tire and Rubber Company is an American tire manufacturer headquartered in Nashville, Tennessee. It was founded in 1900 by Harvey S. Firestone in Akron, Ohio, originally producing solid rubber side-wire tires for fire apparatus. The company later expanded to manufacture pneumatic tires for wagons, carriages, and other wheeled vehicles of the time.

Recognizing the emerging market for automobile tires, Firestone was a pioneer in the mass production of tires. Harvey Firestone's close relationship with Henry Ford helped establish Firestone as the original equipment supplier for Ford Motor Company vehicles, while also maintaining a strong presence in the replacement tire market. In 1988, Firestone was acquired by the Japanese tire manufacturer Bridgestone, and the brand now operates as part of Bridgestone Americas, Inc.

== Company history ==
=== Early to mid 20th century ===
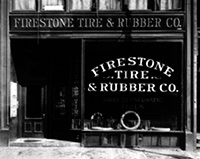
The first Firestone Tire & Rubber Co. store

Firestone was originally based in Akron, Ohio, also the hometown of its archrival, Goodyear Tire and Rubber Company, and two other midsized competitors, General Tire and Rubber Company and B.F. Goodrich Company. Founded on August 3, 1900, the company initiated operations with 12 employees. Together, Firestone and Goodyear were the largest suppliers of automotive tires in North America for over 75 years. In 1906, Henry Ford chose Firestone to supply tires for Ford car models.

In 1918, Firestone Tire and Rubber Company of Canada was incorporated in Hamilton, Ontario, and the first Canadian-made tire rolled off the line on September 15, 1922. During the 1920s, Firestone produced the Oldfield tire, named for racing driver Barney Oldfield.

In 1926, the company opened one of the world's largest rubber plantations, extending over one million acres (1,560 sq mi; 4,050 km^{2}), in Liberia, West Africa. That year the company also opened its first Firestone Tire and Service Center (later renamed Firestone Complete Auto Care). Firestone Complete Auto Care is the division of Firestone that offers automotive maintenance and repair, including tires.

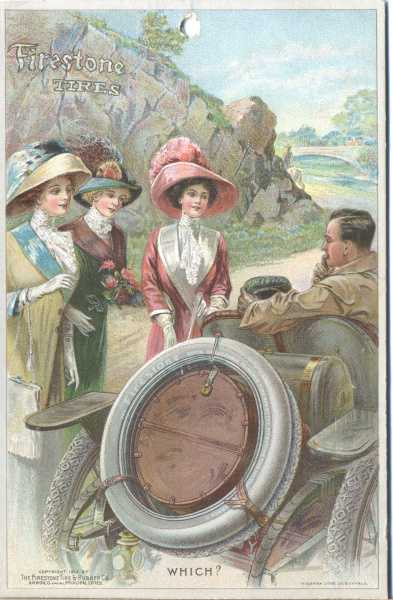
Firestone Tires advertisement c. 1912

In 1927, Henry Ford and Harvey S. Firestone visited Southern California to select locations for new factories. His friends said Ford wanted to be near the ocean and picked Long Beach and suggested Firestone locate in South Gate, California, a small community southeast of downtown Los Angeles that at the time was mostly farmland. Firestone identified 40 acres (16 ha) of beanfields for the site of his new manufacturing plant. Architects Curlett and Beelman designed a spectacular four-story Italianate-style complex, with its own power plant and decorated with polychrome murals by Gladding, McBean depicting the tire and rubber-making process. A year after the plant opened in 1928, it expanded to double the initial size, and by 1954 grew to nearly one million square feet (23 acres; 9.3 ha). The town grew around Firestone; its main boulevard was named after Harvey, and Los Angeles became the number one tire market in the country. By the mid-1970s, Ford and General Motors had massive layoffs as Firestone and other manufacturers opened new plants in non-union locales like Wilson, North Carolina. After considerable downsizing, the South Gate plant was closed in 1980, and 1,300 workers were laid off. East Los Angeles College has proposed a new satellite campus at the site.

In 1928, the company built a factory in Brentford, England, a longtime Art Deco landmark on a major route into the city; this closed in 1979. After its purchase by Trafalgar House, the building was demolished during the August 1980 bank holiday weekend, reportedly in anticipation of its becoming listed.

In 1936, the company opened a plant in Memphis, Tennessee. With a work force exceeding 3,000 employees, the Memphis plant was the largest tire manufacturer in the company's worldwide operation. On July 1, 1963, the company celebrated the production of 100 million tires in Memphis. The Memphis plant closed in 1982, and most of the plant buildings were demolished. The EPA considers the tract a brownfield site, and the possible presence of hazardous substances or contaminants have deterred its redevelopment.

During World War II, the company was called on by the U.S. Government to make artillery shells, aluminum kegs for food transport, and rubberized military products. Barrage balloons were produced at Akron. Firestone ranked 55th among U.S. corporations in the value of wartime military production contracts. In the 1940s, Firestone was given a defense contract to produce plastic helmet liners; while outproduced by Westinghouse Electric, they still made a fair amount for the M1 Helmet.

On September 2, 1940, William Hoppmann, the General Manager of Firestone's Havana office was discharged from his position under the suspicion of being a Nazi agent. On October 11, 1941, a fire at the Firestone Rubber and Latex plant in Fall River, Massachusetts destroyed 5 out of its 8 buildings and destroyed at least 15,000 tons of rubber. The fire caused $12 million in damage (equivalent to $202 million in 2025).

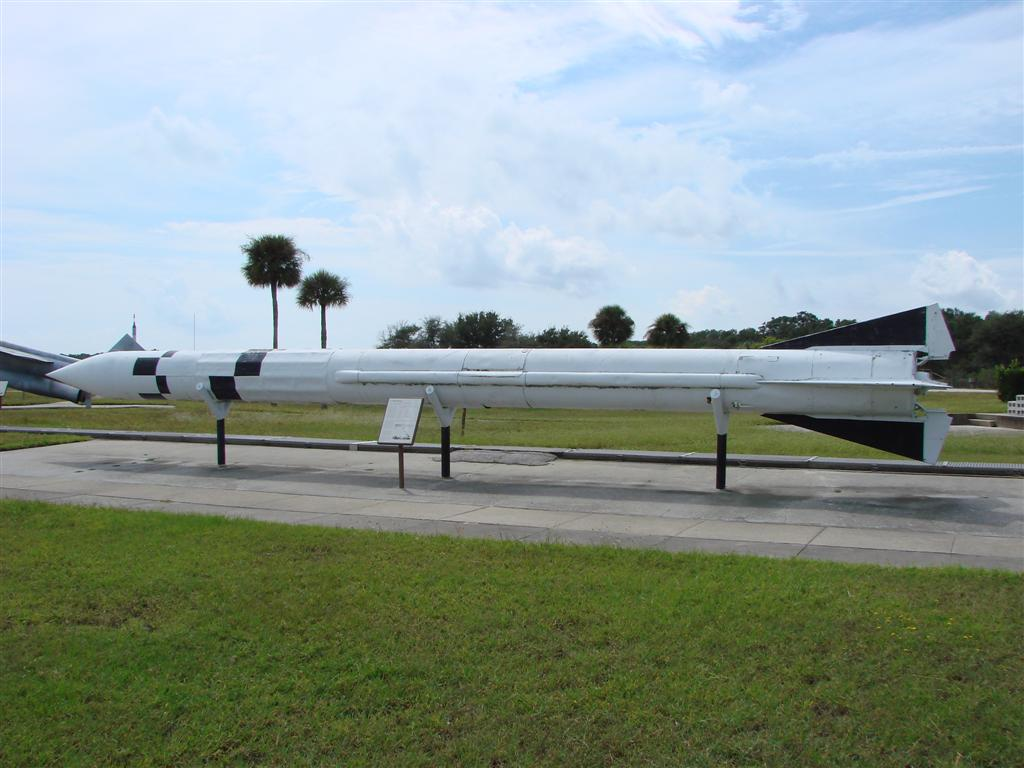
MGM-5 Corporal missile

In 1951, Firestone was given the defense contract for the MGM-5 Corporal missile. Firestone was given a total of US$6,888,796 (equivalent to $68.4 million in 2025) for the first 200 units. Known as the "Embryo of the Army", it was a surface-to-surface guided missile which could deliver a high-explosive warhead up to 75 nautical miles (140 km). It was later modified to be able to carry a nuclear payload for use in the event of Cold War hostilities in Eastern Europe. Built in southern California, this missile was replaced in 1962 by the MGM-29 Sergeant system.

In 1961, Firestone acquired the Dayton Tire division from the Dayco Corporation. Dayco later sued both Firestone and Goodyear, alleging that the two companies conspired to monopolize the tire industry in the United States. The United States District Court dismissed the lawsuit. In 1965, Firestone acquired the Seiberling Rubber Company.

=== Restructuring and sale to Bridgestone ===
In 1972, Firestone received a ten-year import "concession" by the Kenyan government to secure Firestone's investment in a domestic tire plant, which gave it a virtual monopoly. This included both general price and foreign exchange controls. When the ten-year period came to an end in 1979, Firestone retaliated by increasing production, making entry less attractive. Headquarters eventually canceled expansion and failed negotiations led to no further investments.

In late 1979, Firestone brought in John Nevin, the ex-head of Zenith Electronics, as president to save the hemorrhaging company from total collapse. It was more than a billion dollars in debt at the time and losing $250 million a year (equivalent respectively to $3.57 billion and $893 million in 2025). Nevin closed nine of the company's seventeen manufacturing plants, including six in one day, and relocated the company from its ancestral home in Akron, Ohio to Chicago, Illinois. He spun off non-tire related businesses, including the Firestone Country Club; it was considered a deliberate plan to boost the stock price, and it paid off.

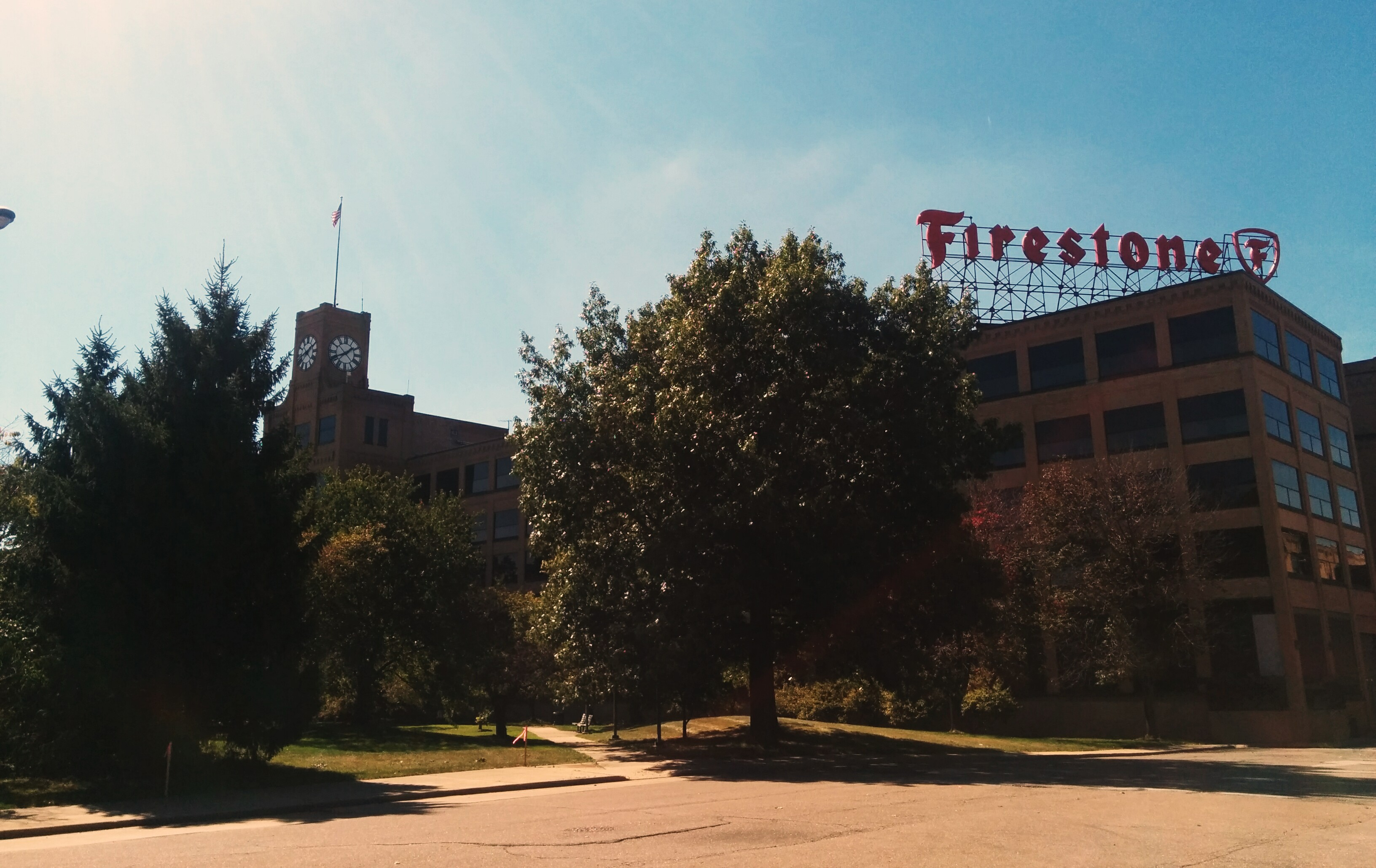
Former Firestone headquarters in Akron

In 1988, after discussions with Pirelli, Nevin negotiated the sale of the company to the Japanese company Bridgestone, which was able to buy the company for much less than it had been worth a decade and a half earlier. The companies celebrated the 20th anniversary of the merger in 2008, and changed the name of the tire division to Bridgestone Americas Tire Operations, LLC.

Bridgestone Americas, which has served as the American branch of Japan-based Bridgestone since 1992, moved their corporate office to downtown Nashville in October 2017. In April 2012, Bridgestone Americas opened up its new Bridgestone Americas Technical Center in Akron. The $100 million facility, located near the former headquarters, tire plant, and technical center, houses 450 employees whose jobs are to develop innovative and advanced tire technologies for the company.

In June 2022, Bridgestone opened up its $21 million Advanced Tire Production Center which replaced the Firestone Advance Tire Works Plant at the original Firestone Tire and Rubber Company headquarters, which opened in 1910. The new building is home of the company's racing tire production for the NTT IndyCar Series. The plant manufactures all Firestone Firehawk racing tires. It is the first new tire plant in the city of Akron in more than 70 years. Bridgestone also opened up a $6 million test track adjacent to the Advanced Tire Production Center to support passenger tire testing and development. The test track opened in autumn 2022. Bridgestone has invested more than $125 million in its Akron operations since 2012, when the company opened the Bridgestone Americas Technology Center.

== Brands and products ==
=== Auto care ===
Firestone Complete Auto Care is a chain of automotive maintenance shops founded in Nashville, Tennessee in 1926. There are over 2,300 Complete Auto Care locations in the United States, all of them independently owned by Firestone, with about 20 million customers each year as of 2002. At the start of 2022 Bridgestone, parent company of Firestone, announced that it will expand its hybrid and electric vehicular services

=== Motorsports ===
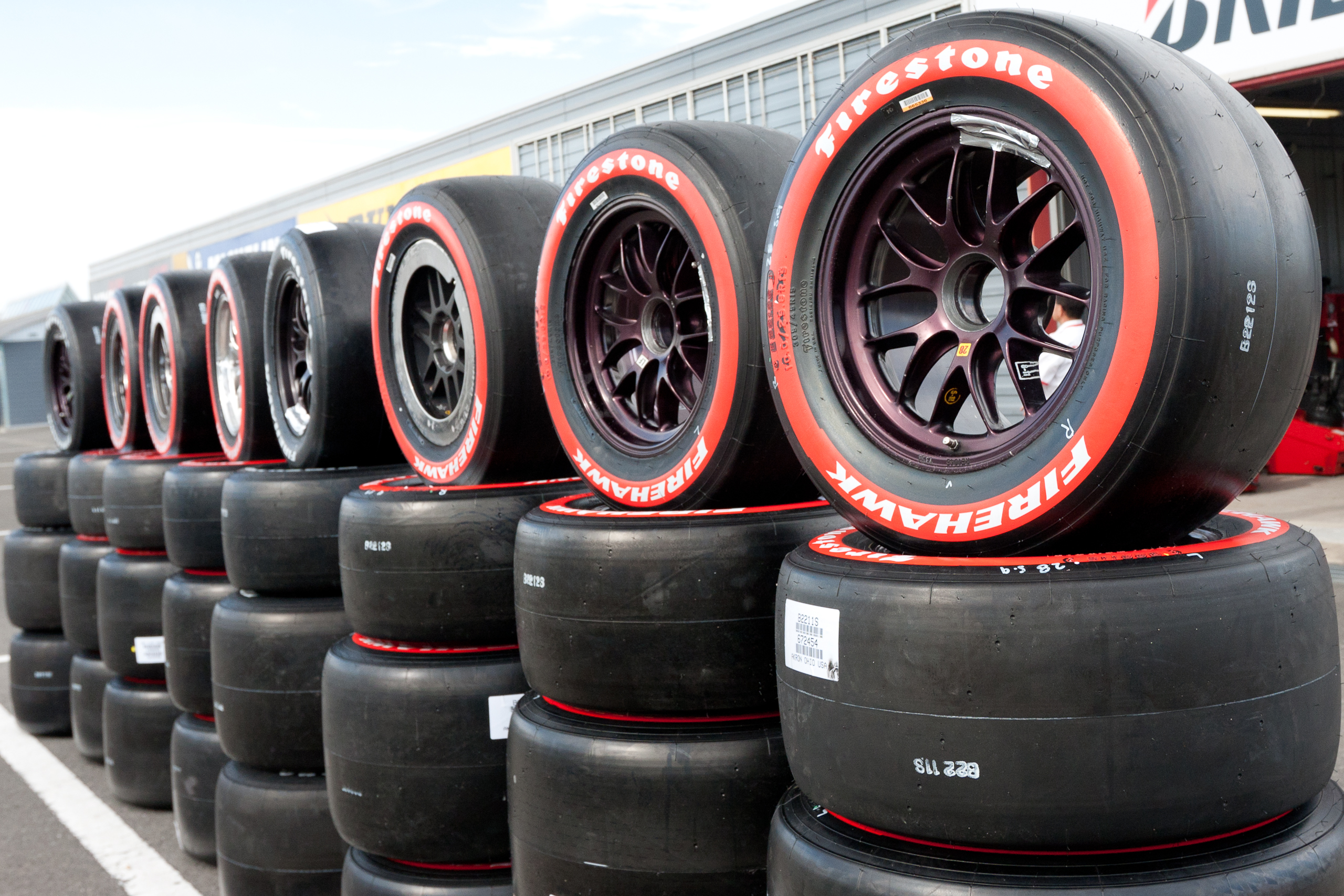
Firestone Firehawk high-performance tires at the Indy Japan 300

The Indianapolis 500 auto race was won in 1911 by a car running Firestone tires, as did all winners of the race from 1920 to 1966. The company also provided tires to NASCAR from 1948 to 1974, and to Formula One from 1950 to 1974 and returned again from 1999 to 2002 as a promotional circuit trackside sponsor due to Bridgestone tire partnership. Citing rising costs as the cause, Firestone announced its withdrawal from professional motorsports in August 1974 with the exception of Formula 5000 and Formula One. The change was forecast to reduce Firestone's annual race testing budget from between $6 and $8 million to around $500,000 (in 2025, roughly equivalent to a reduction from $30.4 million–$40.6 million to $2.54 million.) Shortly afterward, Firestone extended this to a complete withdrawal by the beginning of the 1975 season. The manufacturer returned in 1995 to the CART Series with technical assistance from Bridgestone. Firestone has been the sole supplier of tires for the IndyCar Series since 2000 and will run until the 2030 season.

=== Advertisements ===
Where the Rubber Meets the Road is an advertisement jingle that was frequently used in the 1960s and 1970s, especially on televised sporting events. The jingle was sung by Don Rondo.

Wherever wheels are turning,
No matter what the load,
The name that's known is Firestone
Where the rubber meets the road.

== Controversies ==
=== Great American streetcar scandal ===
In 1950, Firestone along with General Motors and Standard Oil, were charged and convicted of criminal conspiracy for their part in the Great American streetcar scandal. The scandal included purchasing streetcar systems throughout the United States and dismantling and replacing them with buses.

=== Firestone 500 tread separation problem ===
Radial tires were introduced to the U.S. market by rivals B.F. Goodrich and Michelin in the late 1960s, and Firestone lacked their own radial tire. The first radial tire developed and produced by Firestone was the ill-fated Firestone 500 radial. Manufacturing of the new tire was performed on equipment designed to manufacture bias-ply tires.

During the 1970s, Firestone experienced major problems with the Firestone 500 radial. The Firestone 500 steel-belted radials began to show signs of separation of the tread at high speeds. While the cause was never proved, it is believed that the failure of bonding cements, used by Firestone to hold the tread to the tire carcass, may have allowed water to penetrate the tire, which in turn may have caused the internal steel wire to corrode. In March 1978, the U.S. National Highway Traffic Safety Administration (NHTSA) announced publicly a formal investigation into defects of the Firestone 500. The NHTSA investigation found that the tread separation problem was most probably a design defect affecting all Firestone 500s.

In 1973, only two years after the 500's debut, Thomas A. Robertson, Firestone's director of development, wrote an internal memo stating "We are making an inferior quality radial tire which will subject us to belt–edge separation at high mileage". Firestone introduced strict quality control measures in an attempt to fix the inherent problems, however they were not successful in eliminating the basic faults. In 1977 a recall of 400,000 tires produced at the problematic Decatur, Illinois plant was initiated. Firestone blamed the problems on the consumer, stating underinflation and poor maintenance.

On October 20, 1978, Firestone recalled over 7 million Firestone 500 tires, the largest tire recall to date. Congressional hearings into the 500 also took place in 1978. The tire was found to be defective and the cause of 250 deaths. In May 1980 after finding that they knew the tires were defective, the NHTSA fined Firestone $500,000 (equivalent to $1.64 million in 2025), which at that time was the largest fine imposed on any U.S. corporation and the largest civil penalty imposed since passage of the 1966 National Traffic and Motor Vehicle Safety Act. Multiple lawsuits were settled out of court and the constant negative publicity crippled the company's sales and share price.

Harvard Business School and Wharton School of the University of Pennsylvania taught classes and wrote papers on the issues of misjudgments and poor decision-making by the management of Firestone. After years of bad publicity and millions paid out in compensation to victims, Firestone was losing vast amounts of money, and its name was severely damaged.

=== Liberian rubber plantation ===
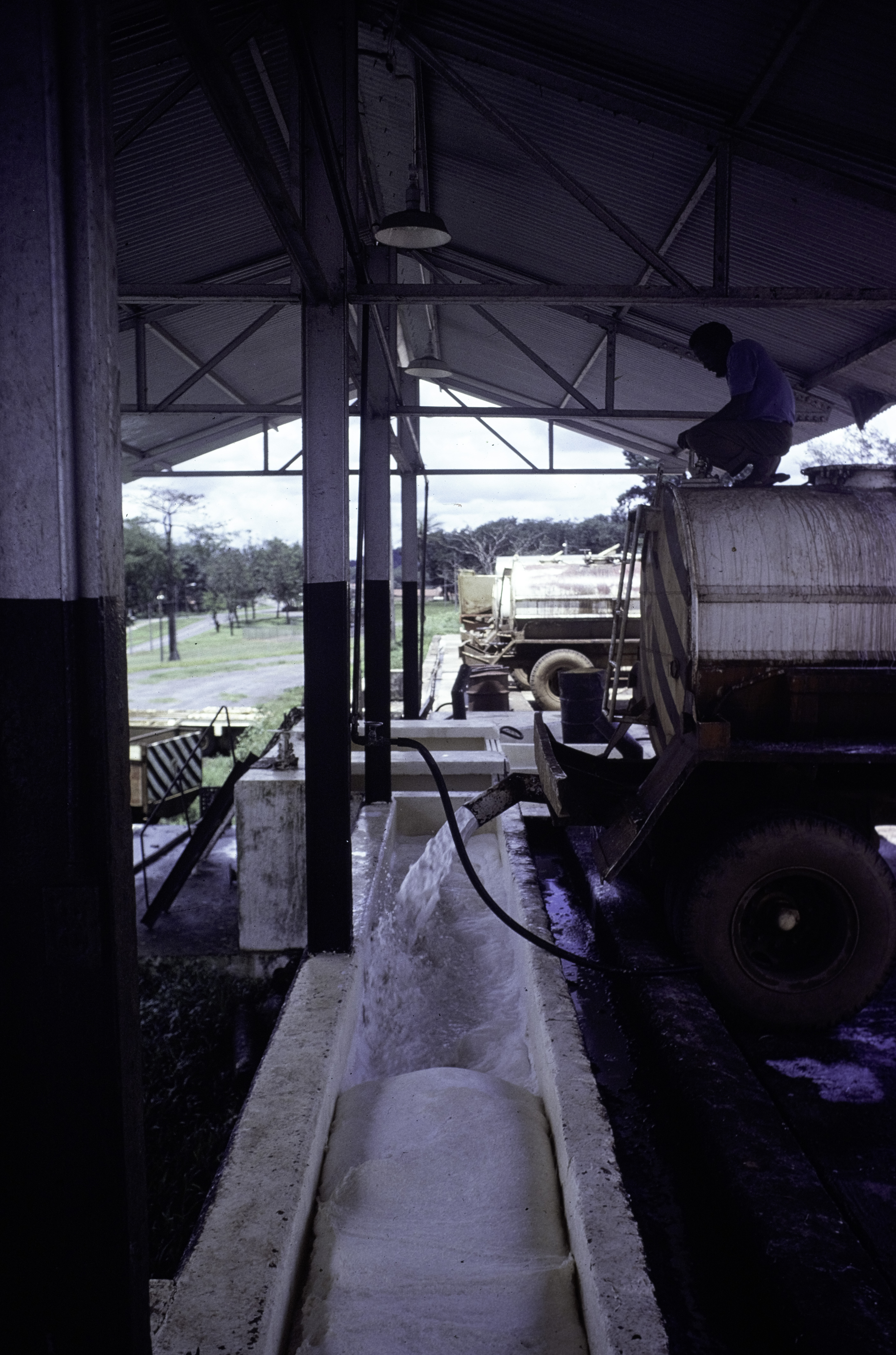
Firestone Rubber Natural plantation c. 1976

Firestone established the Firestone Natural Rubber Company plantation in Harbel, Liberia in 1926. From 1926 until the outbreak of the First Liberian Civil War in 1990, the Firestone rubber plantation was the largest plantation of its kind in the world. It was originally envisioned for 350,000 people to be employed on the newly created plantations. However this was more than the number of able-bodied men in the entire nation at the time, which created intense pressure for labor. In the period between 1926 and 1946 Christine Whyte concluded that:

The collusion between Firestone and government officials to keep wages low and coerce workers onto the plantations was at best substantially overlooked, at worst regarded as a form of "development" in itself.

In September 1990, rebel National Patriotic Front of Liberia forces (led by Charles Taylor, who would later be convicted of war crimes) executed sitting Liberian president Samuel Doe and seized the Harbel plantation. Firestone had to evacuate its American workers as a result. In June 1991, Firestone sent a delegation to Monrovia in an attempt to restart operations in Harbel. After a month of waiting, the delegation was brought to meet Taylor, and after a further six months of negotiations, the company signed a Memorandum of Understanding (MOU) with the National Patriotic Reconstruction Assembly Government's Ministry of Finance in January 1992. This MOU provided for taxes to be paid by Firestone to the Taylor government, and for the Taylor government to protect Firestone's employees and assets in Liberia.

Firestone resumed operations in March 1992, but once again had to halt in October that same year as hostilities escalated. Over this period, the company had paid $2.3 million in taxes to the Taylor government (equivalent to $4.73 million in 2025), which some say helped legitimize Taylor's Greater Liberia government and finance and enable its attack on ECOMOG-controlled Monrovia. Operations did not fully restart until 2003 at the conclusion of the Second Liberian Civil War. Since the end of the war, Firestone has invested over $100 million in restoring and rebuilding its facilities in Liberia.

The company's ventures in Liberia have been the subject of considerable scrutiny and criticism, including a 2005 Alien Tort Claims Act case brought in California by the International Labor Rights Fund and a 2014 investigative report by ProPublica entitled "Firestone and the Warlord", and a PBS Frontline documentary by the same name.

=== Ford Explorer tread separation and rollover problem ===
In 1996, several state agencies in Arizona began experiencing major issues with Firestone tires on Ford Explorers. According to news reports, various agencies demanded new tires, and Firestone conducted an investigation of the complaints, tested the tires and tried to assert that the tires had been abused or under-inflated.

On September 6, 2000, in a statement before the U.S. Senate Appropriations Transportation subcommittee the president of the consumer advocacy group Public Citizen, Joan Claybrook, stated:

...There are a number of parallels between this recall in 2000 and the 1978 recall of the Firestone 500...there was a documented coverup by Firestone of the 500 defect, spurred by the lack of a Firestone replacement tire. When the coverup was disclosed, the top management of the company was replaced as Firestone was severely damaged in reputation and economically. But a key difference is that the Firestone 500 was used on passenger cars, which rarely rolled over with tire failure. NHTSA documented 41 deaths with the 500, a recall, involving seven million tires.

The report went on to indicate that Ford also had been complicit, stating that The Ford Motor Company had instructed Firestone to add a nylon ply to the tires it manufactured in Venezuela for additional strength and that Ford had made suspension changes to the Explorer model available in Venezuela. Ford did not specify adding the nylon ply for U.S.-made Firestone tires nor did it change the Explorer suspension on U.S. models at this time.

An abnormally high failure rate in Firestone's Wilderness AT, Firestone ATX, and ATX II tires resulted in multiple lawsuits, as well as an eventual mandatory recall. In 2001 Bridgestone/Firestone severed its ties to Ford citing a lack of trust. The lack of trust stemmed from concerns that Ford had not heeded warnings by Bridgestone/Firestone relating to the design of the Ford Explorer. In 2006, Firestone announced renewed efforts to recall tires of the same model recalled in 2000 after the tires were linked to recent deaths and injuries. According to Firestone's last filing with the National Highway Transportation Administration, only 90,259 of more than 2.5 million recalled tires were confirmed as removed from service by 2009. In November 2013, two recalled Wilderness AT tires were found in Atlanta, Georgia. One of the tires was offered for sale as new at a used tire retail shop.

Some outside observers have speculated about the blame worthiness of both parties. Firestone tires being prone to tread separation and failure, and the SUVs being especially prone to rolling over if a tire fails at speed compared to other vehicles. A subsequent NHTSA investigation of real world accident data showed that the Ford Explorer SUVs in question were no more likely to roll over after a tread separation than any other SUV.

Labour economists Alan Krueger and Alexandre Mas concluded that one of the main reasons for the high defect rate of Firestone tires was linked to a dispute between the unions and Firestone at the Decatur plant 1994–1996. They find that the tires manufactured at the plant in question around this time featured substantially increased defect rates, rising with the onset of the dispute and subsiding when the dispute was finally settled at the end of 1996. Other similar plants of Firestone did not report similar increases in the defect rate in this period.

== Leadership ==
Presidents and chairmen of Firestone have been:

=== President ===
1. Harvey S. Firestone, 1903–1935
2. John W. Thomas, 1935–1943
3. Harvey S. Firestone Jr., 1943–1949
4. Lee R. Jackson, 1949–1957
5. Raymond C. Firestone, 1957–1965
6. Earl B. Hathaway, 1965–1971
7. Robert D. Thomas, 1971–1972
8. Richard A. Riley, 1972–1976
9. Mario A. DiFederico, 1976–1979
10. John J. Nevin, 1979–1982
11. Leon R. Brodeur, 1982–1984
12. John J. Nevin, 1984

=== Chairman of the Board ===
1. Harvey S. Firestone, 1932–1939
2. John W. Thomas, 1943–1949
3. Harvey S. Firestone Jr., 1949–1966
4. Raymond C. Firestone, 1966–1976
5. Richard A Riley, 1976–1981
6. John J. Nevin, 1981–

== See also ==
- Harvey S. Firestone
- Firestone-Apsley Rubber Company
- Bridgestone
- Formula One tires
- NTT IndyCar Series
