= William M. Mann =

American entomologist

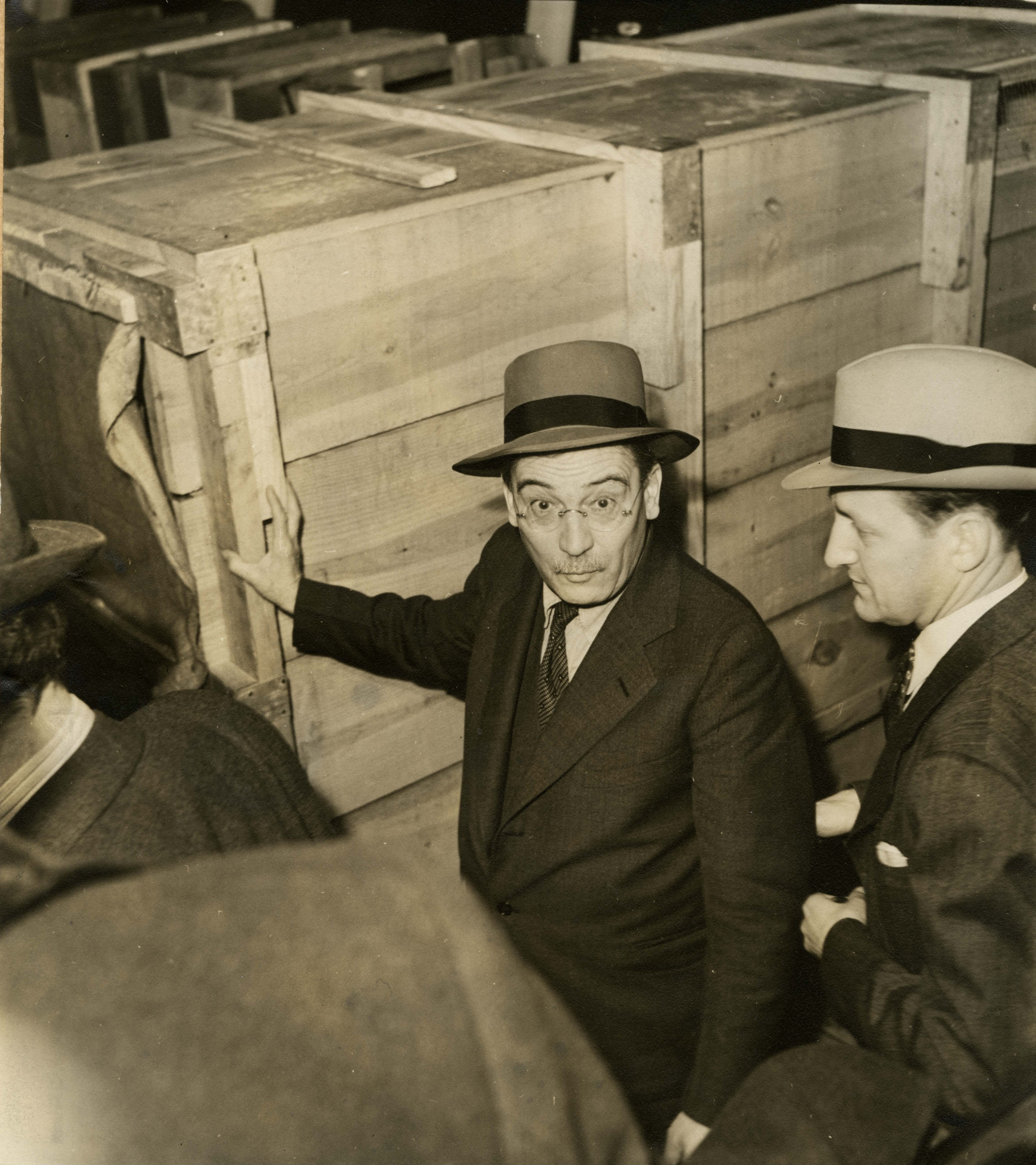
William Mann inspecting the Buffalo crate on ship to Argentina, photo by Lucile Mann, 1939

William Montana Mann (1886–1960) was an American entomologist and the fifth director of the National Zoo in Washington, D.C. from 1925 until 1956. In 1921, he traveled on the Mulford Expedition to the Amazon. In 1926, he married Lucile Quarry Mann. The two worked together as a team to improve and promote the zoo, including going on expeditions around the world to collect live specimens for the zoo's collection. He graduated from Washington State University and Harvard University.

== Legacy ==
Mann is commemorated in the scientific names of four species and one subspecies of reptiles: Amphisbaena manni, Lepidodactylus manni, Letheobia manni, Lygodactylus manni and Rhinoclemmys pulcherrima manni. Mann is also honored in the specific name of the fish Gambusia manni.

== Publications ==
- Mann, W.M. (1912). "Parabiosis in Brazilian ants". Psyche: A Journal of Entomology (Cambridge, Massachusetts) 19: 36–41. [1912-IV].
- Mann, W.M. (1915). "A new form of a southern ant from Naushon Island, Massachusetts". Psyche: J. Entomol. 22: 51.
- Mann, W.M. (1916). "The Stanford Expedition to Brazil, 1911, John C. Branner, Director. The ants of Brazil". Bulletin of the Museum of Comparative Zoolology 60: 399–490.
- Mann, W.M. (1919). "The ants of the British Solomon Islands". Bull. Mus. Comp. Zool. 63: 273-391.
- Mann, W.M. (1920). "Additions to the ant fauna of the West Indies and Central America". Bulletin of the American Museum of Natural History 42: 403–439.
- Mann, W.M. (1921). "The ants of the Fiji Islands". Bull. Mus. Comp. Zool. 64: 401–499.
- Mann, W.M. (1922). "Ants from Honduras and Guatemala". Proceedings of the United States National Museum 61: 1–54.
- Mann, W.M. (1923). "Two new ants from Bolivia. (Results of the Mulford Biological Exploration. - Entomology.)". Psyche: J. Entomol. 30: 13–18.
- Mann, W.M. (1924). "Notes on Cuban ants". Psyche: J. Entomol. 31: 19–23.
- Mann, W.M. (1925). "New beetle guests of army ants". Journal of the Washingnton Academy of Sciences 15: 73–77.
- Mann, W.M. (1925). "Ants collected by the University of Iowa Fiji-New Zealand Expedition". Studies in Natural History, Iowa University 11 (4): 5–6.
- Mann, W.M. (1926). "Some new neotropical ants". Psyche: J. Entomol. 33: 97–107.
- Mann, W.M. (1929). "Notes on Cuban ants of the genus Macromischa (Hymenoptera: Formicidae)". Proceedings of the Entomological Society of Washington 31: 161–166.
- Mann, W.M. (1931). "A new ant from Porto Rico". J. Wash. Acad. Sci. 21: 440–441.
- Mann, W.M. (1935). "Two new ants collected in quarantine". Psyche: J. Entomol. 42: 35–37.
- Mann, W.M. (1950). Ant Hill Odyssey. Boston: Little, Brown and Company.
- Wheeler, W.M.; Mann, W.M. (1914). "The ants of Haiti". Bull. American Mus. Nat. Hist. 33: 1–61.
- Wheeler, W.M.; Mann, W.M. (1916). "The ants of the Phillips Expedition to Palestine during 1914". Bull. Mus. Comp. Zool. 60: 167–174.
- Wheeler, W.M.; Mann, W.M. (1942a). [Untitled. Pseudomyrma picta Stitz var. heterogyna Wheeler and Mann, var. nov.]. pp. 172–173. in: Wheeler, W.M. "Studies of Neotropical ant-plants and their ants". Bull. Mus. Comp. Zool. 90: 1–262.
- Wheeler, W.M.; Mann, W.M. (1942b). [Untitled. Pseudomyrma triplarina (Weddell) var. rurrenabaquensis Wheeler & Mann, var. nov.]. pp. 188–189. in: Wheeler, W.M. "Studies of Neotropical ant-plants and their ants". Bull. Mus. Comp. Zool. 90: 1–262.
- Wheeler, W.M.; Mann, W.M. (1942c). [Untitled. Allomerus decemarticulatus Mayr subsp. novemarticulatus Wheeler & Mann, subsp. nov.]. p. 199. in: Wheeler, W.M. "Studies of Neotropical ant-plants and their ants". Bull. Mus. Comp. Zool. 90: 1–262.
- Wheeler, W.M.; Mann, W.M. (1942d). [Untitled. Azteca brevicornis Mayr var. boliviana Wheeler & Mann, var. nov.]. p. 225. in: Wheeler, W.M. "Studies of Neotropical ant-plants and their ants". Bull. Mus. Comp. Zool. 90: 1–262.
- Wheeler, W.M.; Mann, W.M. (1942e). [Untitled. Azteca ulei Forel var. gagatina Wheeler and Mann var. nov.]. p. 246. in: Wheeler, W.M. "Studies of Neotropical ant-plants and their ants". Bull. Mus. Comp. Zool. 90: 1–262.
- Wheeler, W.M.; Mann, W.M. (1942f). [Untitled. Myrmelachista (Decamera) schumanni Emery var. cordincola Wheeler & Mann, var. nov.]. p. 255. in: Wheeler, W.M. "Studies of Neotropical ant-plants and their ants". Bull. Mus. Comp. Zool. 90: 1–262.
