= United States Air Force Security Forces =

Ground combat and military police force of the US Air Force and Space Force

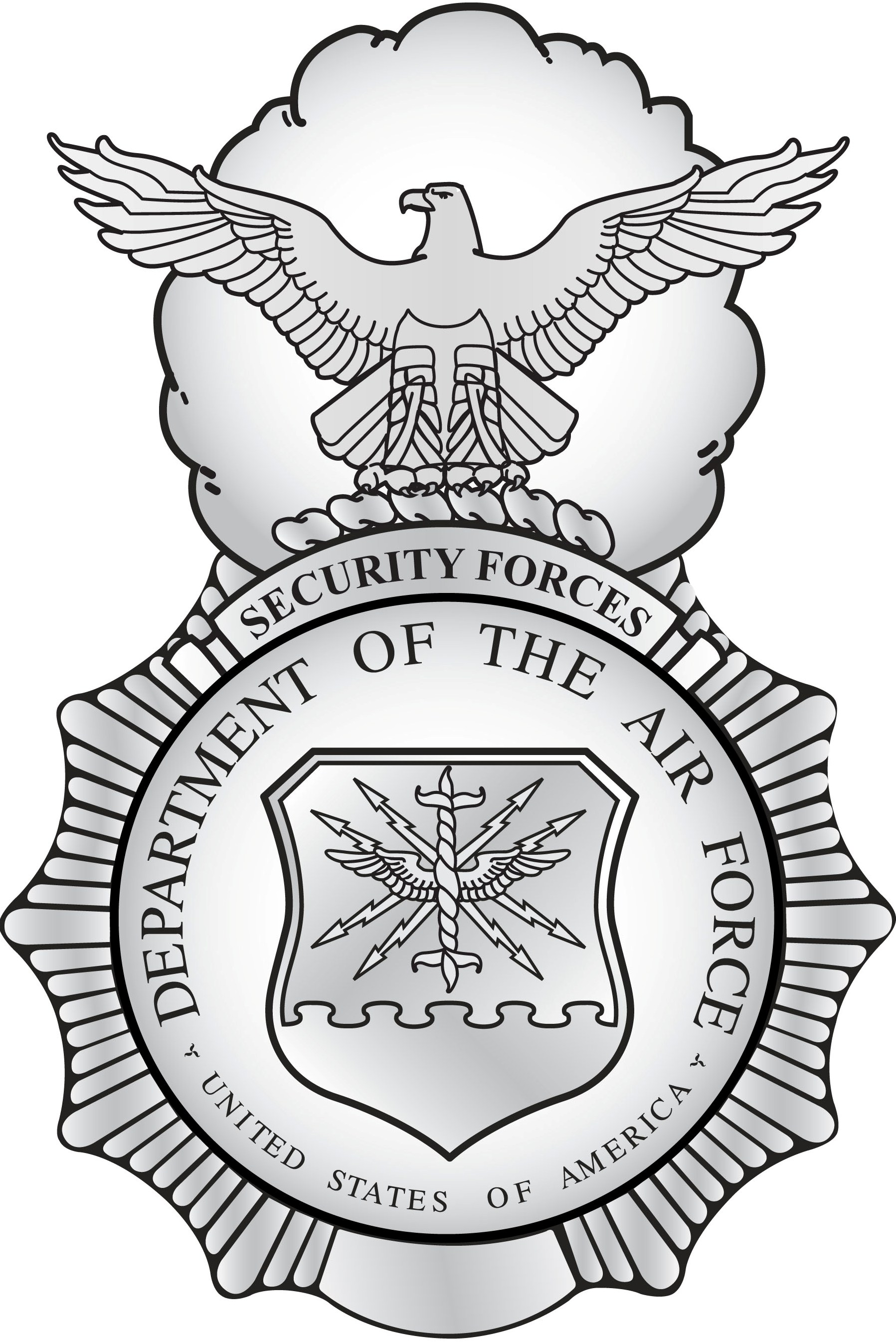
- Security Forces Shield
- Active: 31 October 1997 – present (as Security Forces); 1966 – 31 October 1997 (as Security Police); 2 January 1948 – 1966 (as Air Police); 12 February 1942 – 2 January 1948 (as Military Police)
- Country: United States
- Branch: United States Air Force (Note: under current name since 31 October 1997. Formerly part of the United States Army's Army Air Forces from 29 March 1943 to 26 September 47.)
- Type: Military police Ground defense force
- Role: Military law enforcement Ground defense
- Size: 38,000+
- Nickname: Defenders
- Mottos: Defensor Fortis (Defenders of the Force)
- Color of Beret: Dark Blue
- Website: Official website

Commanders
- Director of Security Forces: Col Damian Schlussel
- Career Field Manager: CMSgt Donald Gallagher

Insignia
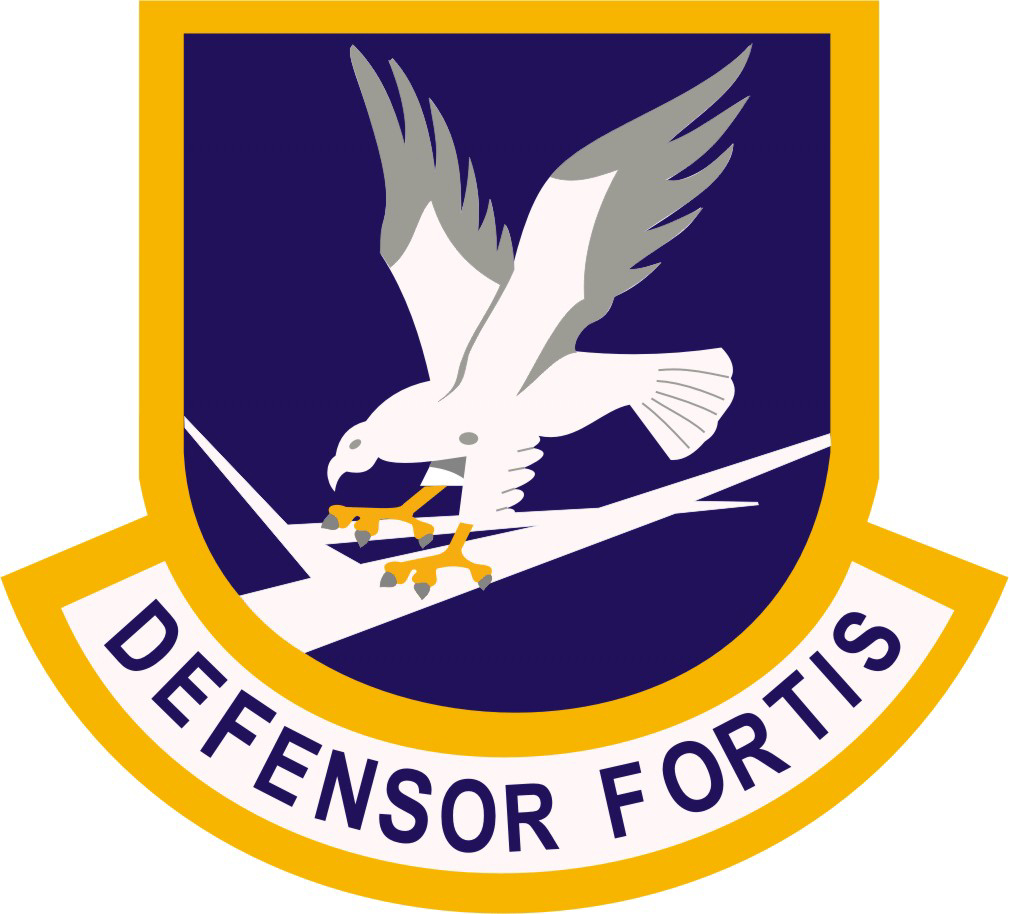
- Enlisted beret flash

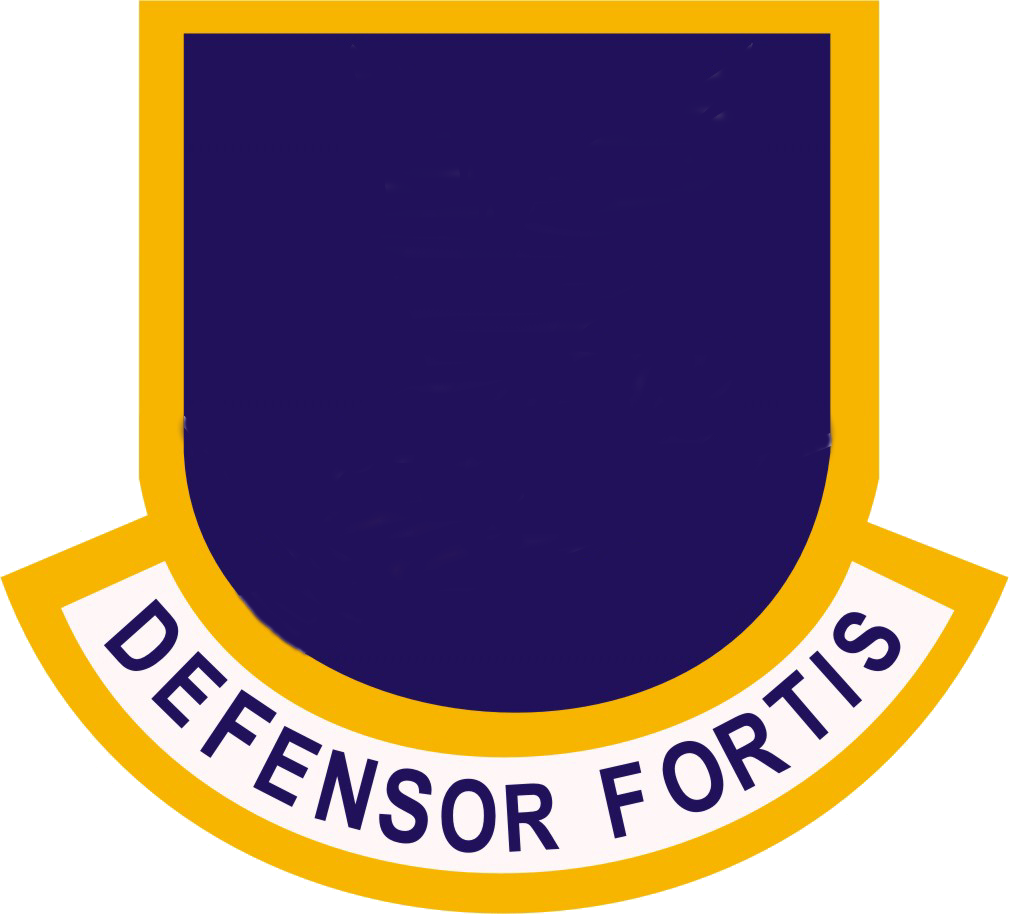
- Officer beret flash (superimposed with polished metal rank insignia)

- Occupation Badge

- USAF Security Forces Beret

The United States Air Force Security Forces (SF) are the ground combat force and military police service of the U.S. Air Force and U.S. Space Force. The USAF Security Forces were formerly known as Military Police (MP), Air Police (AP), and Security Police (SP) at various points in their history. They were formed on the premise of being the Air Force's "Marine Corps", in that they would provide security for the Air Force similar to how the Marines provide security for the Navy.

== Mission ==
As outlined in Department of the Air Force publications, Security Forces are responsible for protecting, defending, and fighting to ensure U.S. Air Force, joint, and coalition mission success. They are responsible not only for installation law and discipline enforcement, but also base defense and ground combat.

The USAF uses the term Air Base Ground Defense (ABGD) for defense of U.S. Air Force bases. This specialty is filled by members of the Air Force Security Forces, who serve not only as military law enforcement officers, but also as ground combat troops defending U.S. air bases around the world from possible attacks. In these capacities, their duties are similar to a combination of the roles performed in the UK military by the RAF Regiment and RAF Police.

Lackland AFB in Texas is where the primary technical training begins for trainees, Camp Bullis in Texas is where all levels of Air Base Ground Defense (ABGD) are instructed, the course ranges in length from 4–6 weeks. In these weeks of training Air Force Security Forces are taught to operate the following weapons: M4 Carbine, M-18, M-9, M-203, M-240B, M-249 (SAW), MK-19, as well as other base defense weapons and tools. In 1966–1969, sentry dog teams used the Smith & Wesson K-38 Combat Masterpiece.

Under the Interservice Agreement between the United States Air Force and the United States Army, the U.S. Air Force is responsible for ground combat operations to defend U.S. air bases. Air Force Security Forces fulfill this mission, and, as such, are trained in the whole range of infantry tactics, to include patrolling, close quarters battle, defense in depth, crew-served weapons, and other ground combat tactics.

== Personnel ==
=== Leadership ===
The director of Security Forces is a Brigadier General and the highest-ranking Security Forces officer, sometimes referred to as the "Top Cop". The director of Security Forces reports to the deputy chief of staff of the Air Force for logistics, engineering and force protection. The director of Security Forces has the responsibility to develop policy, doctrine, and guidance for Security Forces and serves as the executive agent for the Department of Defense Military Working Dog Program.

The deputy director of Security Forces acts as the second-in-command to the director of Security Forces. The Security Forces Career Field Manager is a chief master sergeant and the senior enlisted Defender, acting as an adviser to the director of Air Force Security Forces.

== History ==
=== Military Police (Aviation) and Air Base Defense Battalions ===
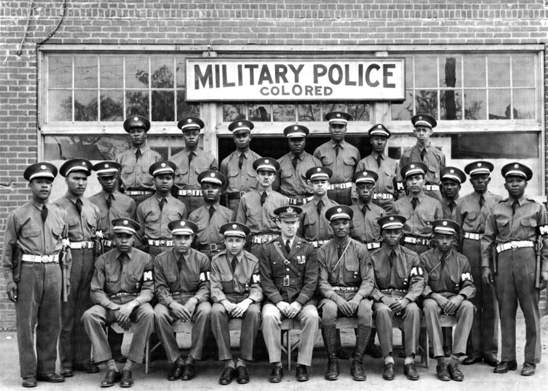
Army Air Force Military Police "colored" unit at Columbus, GA, in April 1942

The USAF Security Forces lineage can be traced to its beginning in WWII with the German blitzkrieg. Blitzkrieg relied on swift attacks by land and air. One of the tactics employed by blitzkrieg was the use of paratroops and airborne forces to capture, or destroy in advance, air bases. A key turning point in air base defensive thinking came with the loss of the Battle of Crete to German forces and capture of the British air base at Maleme in 1941. This single action led then prime minister Winston Churchill to study British air base defense policy, and in a condemning memo to the Secretary of State for Air and to the Chief of the Air Staff dated 29 June 1941, Churchill stated he would no longer tolerate the shortcomings of the Royal Air Force (RAF), in which half a million RAF personnel had no combat role. He ordered that all airmen be armed and ready "to fight and die in defense of their air fields" and that every airfield should be a stronghold of fighting air-ground men and not "uniformed civilians in the prime of life protected by detachments of soldiers." Churchill's directive resulted in formation of the RAF Regiment.

On 12 February 1942 the United States adopted the British air defense philosophy. The Army Chief of Staff, Gen. George C. Marshall, approved the allocation of 53,299 African-Americans to the Army Air Forces with the "stipulation that air base defense 'for the number of air bases found necessary' be organized and that 'Negro personnel' be used for this purpose as required." This order formed the Army Air Forces (AAF) air base security battalions in June 1942. Units were deployed throughout the European, Asian and African theaters and designed to defend against local ground attacks. These units were armed with rifles, machine guns and 37mm guns.

On 29 March 1943, General Hap Arnold, the commander of the Army Air Forces, established the Office of the Air Provost Marshal, which established three separate organizations for the law enforcement and security role: Guard Squadrons, Military Police Companies (Aviation), and Air Base Security Battalions. Guard Squadrons were assigned to provide interior law enforcement and security to bases within the continental United States, with a technical guard school at Miami Army Air Field and a military police school at Buckley Field. Outside the United States the duties of law enforcement and internal security were carried out by Military Police Companies (Aviation), which, while a part of the Army Air Forces, were still part of the Army's Military Police Corps. Their training was conducted at Camp Ripley. Air Base Security Battalions, the direct predecessors to the USAF Security Forces, were formed to be the ground combat force of the Army Air Forces, much like the RAF Regiment is for the Royal Air Force. The battalions operated machine guns, mortars, grenade launchers, rocket launchers, half-tracks, self-propelled guns, and even light tanks, with the official history of the Air Base Security Battalions referring to them as the Army Air Forces' "infantry"

When the Air Force was created with the signing of the National Security Act of 1947, all members of the AAF were transferred to the new branch, to include military police attached to the Army Air Forces.

=== Air Police ===
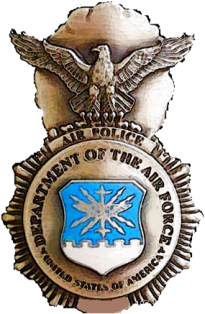
Former Air Police badge

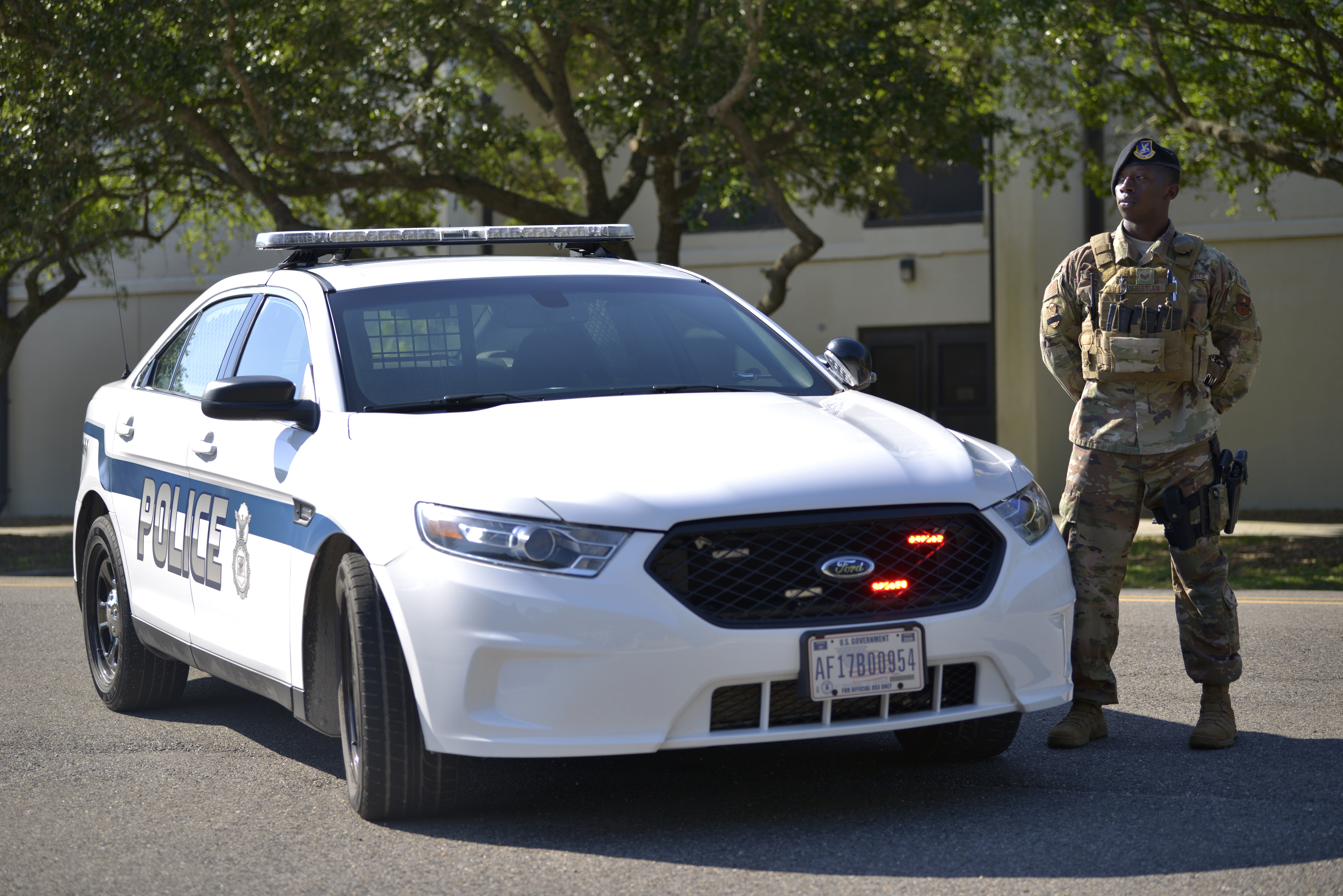
USAF Security Forces FPIS with an airman in 2019 Police Week Retreat Ceremony

On 2 January 1948 the Military Police were reformed into the Air Police and established the Air Provost Marshal. Immediately twenty-two military police companies were predesignated Air Police squadrons, though the term Air Police did not come into full usage until November 1948. The full transfer of personnel from the Army to the Air Force was supposed to be completed by December 1948, but was not completed until 1953. In April 1952 Army grade titles and MOS designations were replaced with Air Force AFSCs.

In June 1950 the Air Force began urgent operations focused on air base defense with the outbreak of the Korean War. A buildup of ground combat forces began. The center of this buildup was the expansion of the Air Force Air Police from 10,000 in July 1950 to 39,000 in December 1951. Still, one year into the war the Air Provost Marshal reported that "the Air Force is without policy or tactical doctrine for Air Base Ground Defense." In haste, Air Police serving as the cadre of this force were outfitted with armored vehicles, machine guns and recoilless rifles. Air base defense was officially implemented by Air Force Regulation (AFR) 355–4 on 3 March 1953. AFR 355-4 defined air base defense "as all measures taken by the installation commander to deny hostile forces access to the area encompassing all buildings, equipment, facilities, landing fields, dispersal areas and adjacent terrain." However, the regulation did not include provisions for sustained ground defense operations. Performance of this mission fell to the provisional base defense task forces to be organized and equipped like infantry. It was the Strategic Air Command's (SAC) October 1952 edition of the SAC Manual 205-2 that rejected the notion that the USAF's ground defense mission conflicted with Army functions. SAC officials felt that success of the Air Force mission might require point defense elements that the Army could not afford to protect, much less have the Air Force rely on the Army to come to the rescue. After the Korean War, General Curtis LeMay had the Air Police begin the Combat Arms Program, to better train airmen in the use of weapons.

On 1 September 1950 the Air Police School was established at Tyndall Air Force Base. In 1952 the Air Police school was transferred to Parks AFB, California, and re-designated the "Air Base Defense School" to emphasize on air base defense capabilities. It soon became evident the emphasis on air base defense was not making much headway. On 13 October 1956 Air Police training was transferred to Lackland AFB, Texas, where it evolved into Security Police training and eventually became the US Air Force Security Forces Academy.

Toward the end of the 1950s and into the 1960s, the Air Police began to reemphasize the security aspect of their mission, with a strong focus being given to protecting the Air Force's strategic nuclear weapons, and a greater amount of centralization regarding training occurred. The Air Provost Marshal was also redesignated the Director of Security and Law Enforcement.

On 1 November 1964, between 12:25 and 12:33 am, Vietnamese Communist (VC) troops attacked Bien Hoa Air Base with six 81mm mortars positioned about 400 meters north, outside the air base. The VC fired 60–80 rounds into parked aircraft and troop billets, then withdrew undetected and unabated. The attack killed four US military personnel, wounded 30 and destroyed and/or damaged 20 B-57 bombers. U.S. air bases had become targets and became routine targets thereafter. The Air Force was not allowed to patrol the perimeter of their bases. That role was left up to the Vietnamese Air Force. Also, the U.S. Army was cited as being tasked to control the security of the area around the air base, and after-action scrutiny along with politics served to foster distrust and jealousy between services, chains of command and the U.S. and Vietnamese services. As a result, air bases in South Vietnam were left vulnerable. By striking at USAF air bases the North Vietnamese Army (NVA) and VC employed Giulio Douhet's military concept, which stated the only effective way to counter air power was to destroy its bases on the ground. This concept has also been proven effective during the Indochina War from 1946 to 1954, when the Viet Minh regularly and successfully attacked French air bases.

The USAF Sentry Dog program was a product of the Korean War. On 1 May 1957 the Air Force gained responsibility for training all working dogs in the Department of Defense. By 1965 the USAF had a pool of sentry dog teams available for deployment to South Vietnam. Nightly at every air base, sentry dog teams were deployed as a detection and warning screen in the zone separating combat forces from the perimeter. Nearly all air base defense personnel agreed that the Sentry Dog Teams rendered outstanding service, with some going as far to say "Of all the equipment and methods used to detect an attacking enemy force, the sentry dog has provided the most sure, all-inclusive means."

=== Security Police ===
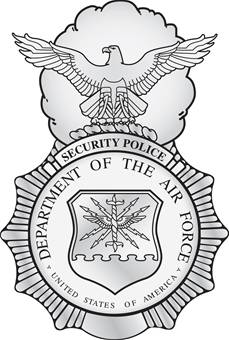
Former Security Police badge

During their time in Korea and early in Vietnam, the Air Police found themselves in a number of ground combat roles, some of which more accurately reflected an infantry-type role than that of the military police. In 1966 the Air Police were redesignated the Security Police, in an effort to more accurately reflect the security and combat aspect of their mission.

Project "Safe Side," circa 1968 (6:03)
Creation of the 1041st SPS

Shortly after the creation of the Security Police, in 1967 the "Safe Side" program was activated, which resulted in certain Security Police squadrons being trained in the use of light infantry tactics and special weapons to better enhance air base defense. Many of the squadrons that were part of the Safe Side project, such as the 1041st Security Police Squadron (Test), established observation posts, listening posts, conducted reconnaissance and ambush patrols, and served as mobile response forces to protect the airbases. The successes of this initial squadron resulted in the creation of the 82nd Combat Security Police Wing and the development of ground combat training for all security policemen. In 1968 the Air Force accepted the Safe Side Program's recommendation to establish 559-man Combat Security Police Squadrons (CSPS) organized into three field flights. Three CSPS were incrementally activated, trained and deployed in 179-day temporary duty rotations to South Vietnam. On 15 March 1968 the 821st CSPS began a hasty training program at Schofield Barracks, Hawaii, and was in place at Phan Rang Air Base on its TDY deployment by 15 April. The 822nd CSPS was organized, more completely trained and replaced the 821st in August 1968. The 823rd CSPS was trained at Fort Campbell, Kentucky, and replaced the 822nd in March 1969, remaining until August 1969 when it was replaced by the 821st.

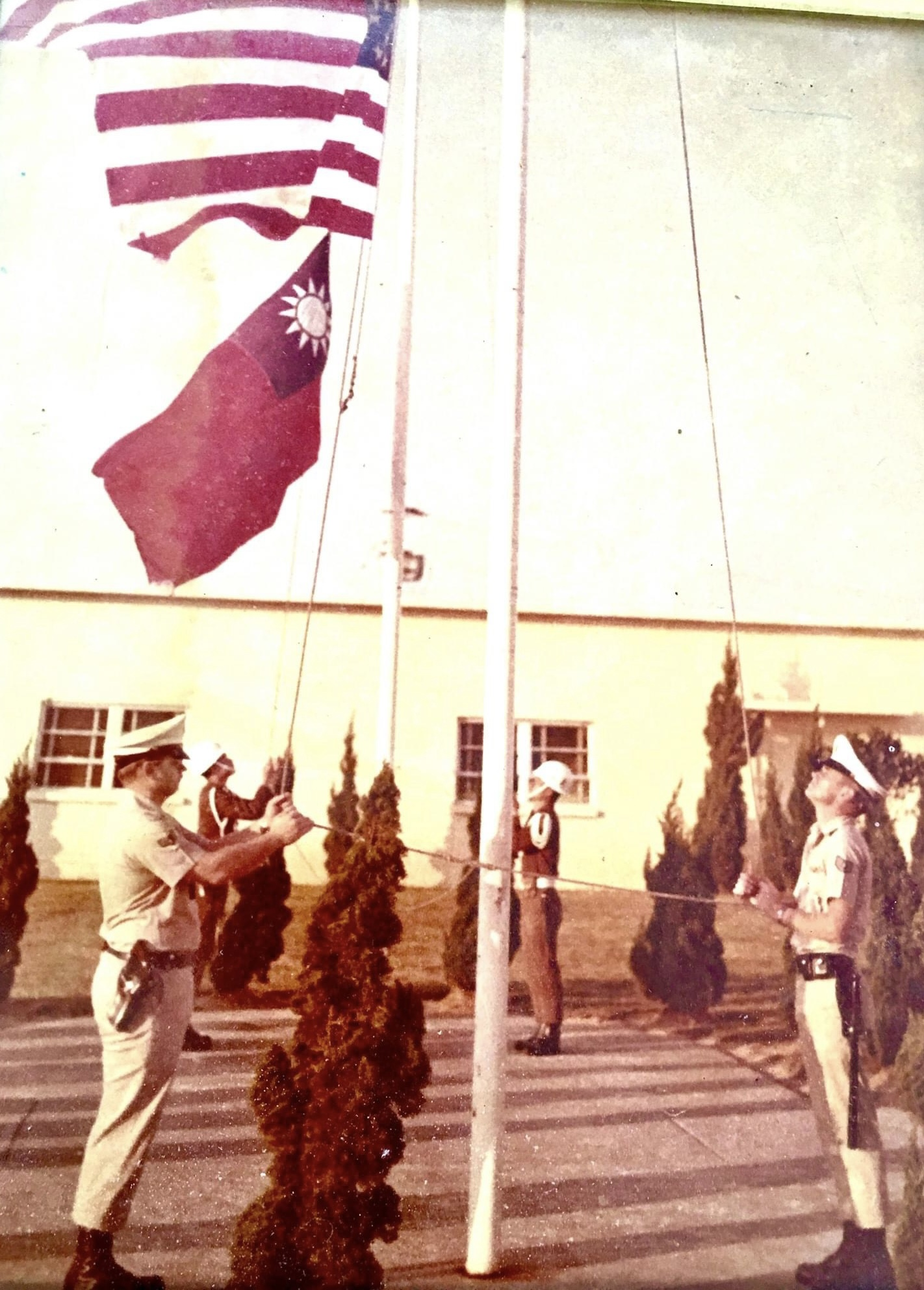
Ching Chuan Kang Air Base, Taiwan, Flag Raising of the U.S. Air Force Security Police and the ROC Air Force Military Police, 1973

The vindication for the Safe Side program occurred during the Battle of Tan Son Nhut, as part of the Tet Offensive, on 31 January 1968, when Tan Son Nhut Airbase was attacked by a combined force of seven North Vietnamese Army and Viet Cong battalions, composing an enemy force of 2,500 enemy troops. The combat-trained Security Police were able to hold off the North Vietnamese forces, preventing the loss of the airbase. The Vietnam War demonstrated to the Air Force the need for whole base defense measures, and demonstrated that airmen, regardless of AFSC, could be vulnerable to attack, just the same as Army and Marine forces.

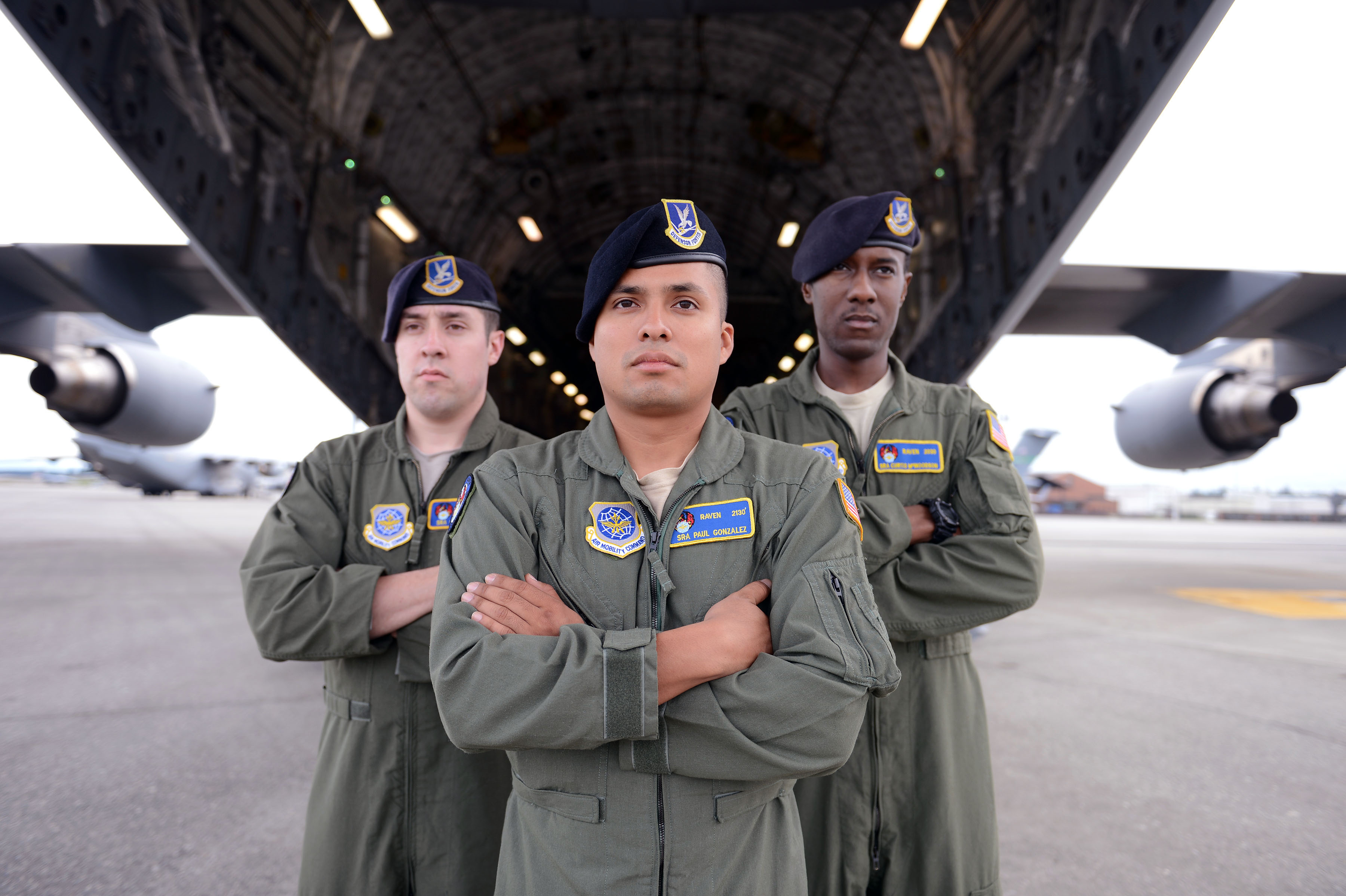
The 627th Security Forces Squadron of the Phoenix Ravens security force pose with a C-17 aircraft

By January 1971 the Security Police career field was split into two separate functions: Law Enforcement Specialist (AFSC 811X2) and Security Specialist (AFSC 811X0). In November 1971 the first female airmen trained into the law enforcement specialty, and in November 1976 100 female airmen were trained as security specialists. Although the female security specialist program was soon after shut down, they have the distinction of being the first women permitted into any combat role in the entire U.S. Armed Forces. Law enforcement specialists, who had excelled in their career field, could be selected as criminal investigators and attend Military Police Investigations training at the 3280th TCHTG OLA Air Force Liaison at Ft. McClellan, AL, or attend the Office of Special Investigations basic agent's course at Bolling AFB, Washington DC.

In May 1975, Security Police units were tasked with a high priority rescue operation of the SS Mayaguez merchant ship, and with Air Force helicopters, were preparing to perform a boarding of the ship. Prior to the rescue mission one of the helicopters crashed, killing 18 security policemen, and forcing the mission to be aborted. The loss of this aircraft was attributed to a failure to properly assemble a blade sleeve during overhaul nearly a year earlier.

From 1981 to 1989 the Security Police were responsible for protecting the USAF's ground launched cruise missiles in Europe, providing security for them during the height of the Cold War. In 1983, during Operation Urgent Fury, Security Police forces were among the first on Grenada, responsible for securing runways and POWs. In January 1985 women were finally permitted to enter the security field – the first since 1976.

In 1987 the standard weapon of the Security Police Law Enforcement Branch was changed from the Smith & Wesson Model 15 .38-cal. six-shot revolver to the Beretta M9, a 9mm semi-automatic pistol with a standard 15-round magazine, which brought the Security Police in line with the rest of the United States Armed Forces. Also in 1987 the Air Base Ground Defense School was moved from Camp Bullis to Fort Dix, where the Army was given control of the training. In 1989, as a part of Operation Just Cause, Security Police units were responsible for securing airfields during the Invasion of Panama and performing drug interdiction and humanitarian missions.

In August 1990, Security Police were deployed to Saudi Arabia as a part of Operation Desert Shield, where they were responsible for guarding airbases, dignitary support, and counterterrorism. In August 1995 Air Base Ground Defense Training was moved from Fort Dix back to Camp Bullis, and control was shifted from the Army back to the Air Force. During Operation Joint Endeavor in Bosnia, Security Police forces conducted convoy operations and acted as a peacekeeping force. In 1996 the Khobar Towers Bombing occurred, with 19 airmen killed and 260 injured. Security Policemen SSgt Alfredo Guerrero, SrA Corey Grice and A1C Christopher Wager received the Airman's Medal for their actions prior to and after the terrorist attack.

=== Security Forces ===
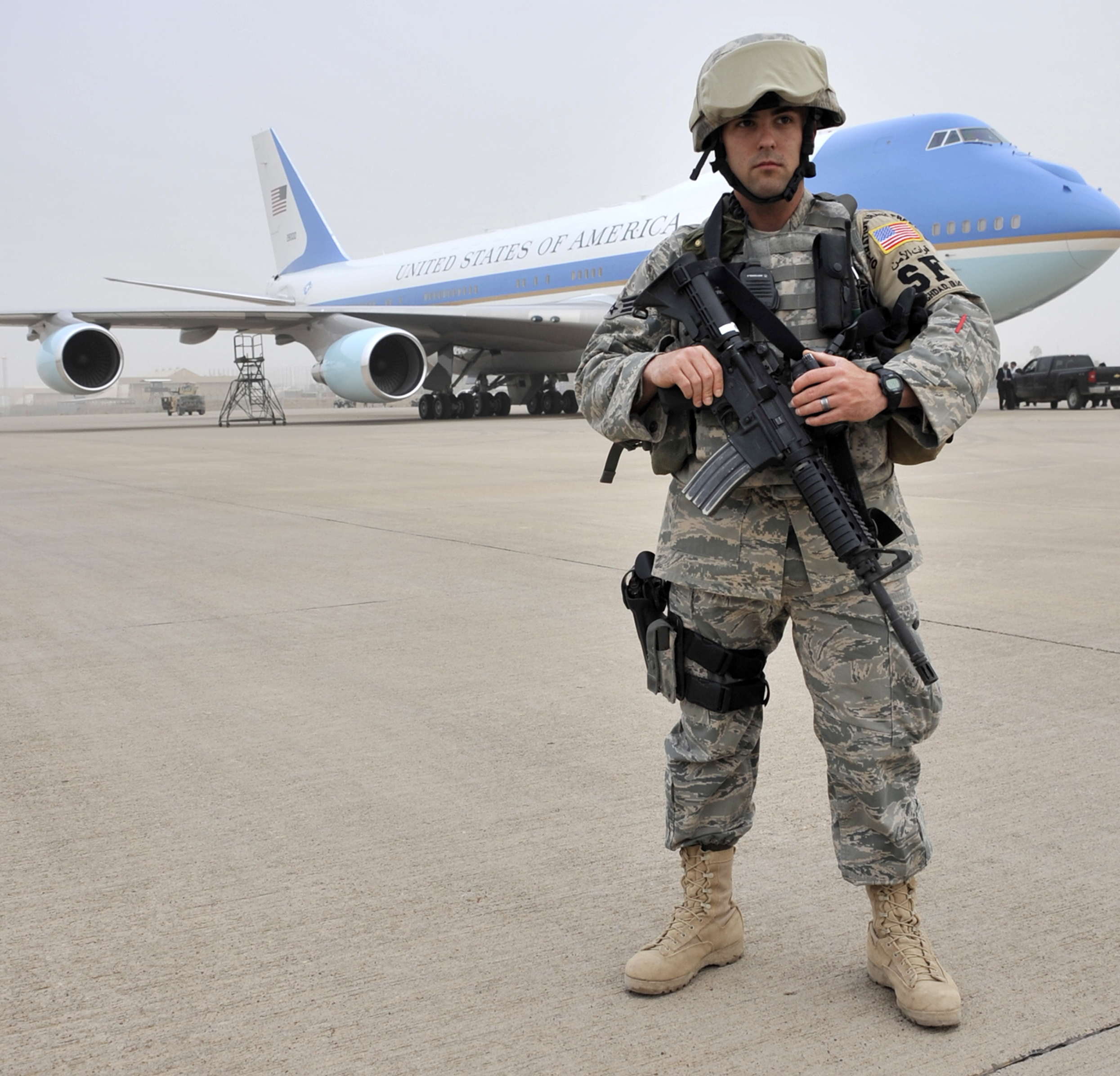
USAF Security Forces airman guarding Air Force One on the flight line in Iraq, 2009

In response to the Khobar Towers bombing, the Air Force reevaluated how the Security Police was organized, and came to the realization it could not afford to have only a few specialize in the security aspect of the mission. On 31 October 1997, the Security Police became the Security Forces, with all individual specialties being merged into one Security Forces specialist AFSC. The Security Forces brought back the principles of Safe Side, transforming the Security Forces into a combat force.

In 1997 the Air Force activated the 820th Base Defense Group, a Force Protection unit based at Moody Air Force Base, Georgia. The unit is a trained force protection unit of 12 Air Force Specialty Codes with an airborne capability, and is intended to serve as a quick reaction force, capable of deploying anywhere in the world. Air Mobility Command also activated the Raven program, which attached Security Forces specialists to its aircraft to provide on-site security in hostile or remote environments.

After the 9/11 attacks in 2001, Security Forces prepared for additional attacks and combat operations, both in the United States and abroad. On 16 December 2001, airmen with the 786th Security Forces Squadron deployed to Manas International Airport, Kyrgyzstan, to provide security while the airbase was under construction, to support U.S. operations in Afghanistan. Three months later the 822nd Security Forces Squadron assumed the role, and conducted patrols outside the airbase to deter attack and build relations with local villagers.

On 19 March 2003 the United States invaded Iraq, and on the same day members of the 161st Security Forces Squadron arrived in country, securing the newly captured Tallil Air Base. On 26 March 2003, elements of the 786th Security Forces Squadron performed the first Security Forces combat jump in Air Force history, taking Bashur Air Base in conjunction with the Army's 173rd Airborne Brigade.

Throughout the conflicts in Iraq and Afghanistan, Security Forces specialists, and airmen as a whole were pressed into more ground combat roles, to include running convoys. This resulted in the formation of The Aerospace Expeditionary Force Transport Company. These companies were not divided into flights, but rather platoons, with the first, the 2632nd Aerospace Expeditionary Force Transport Company, deploying in April 2004. Some Security Forces specialists were also attached to Army and Marine infantry units to provide either manpower or military working dogs.

On 1 January 2005 Task Force 1041 was formed by elements of the 820th Security Forces Group to execute Operation Desert Safe Side. The objective was to conduct outside the wire "kill or capture" missions in one of the most violent areas of Iraq. At the end of the operation, they had reduced attacks on the local airbase to almost zero, while capturing 18 high-value targets, eight major weapons caches, and 98 other insurgent or terrorist targets. Units, such as the 824th Security Forces Squadron, were responsible for training Iraqi security forces. In Summer 2008 the 332nd Expeditionary Security Forces Squadron stood up at Balad Airbase, and for the first time since the Vietnam War a Security Forces Squadron assumed full responsibility for the security, both on and off base, of a major air base in a war zone.

On 28 September 2005, the 586th Expeditionary Security Forces Squadron became the first combat Security Forces squadron to lose a member in Operation Iraqi Freedom when A1C Elizabeth Jacobson was killed in action near Safwan, Basra Governorate, Iraq.

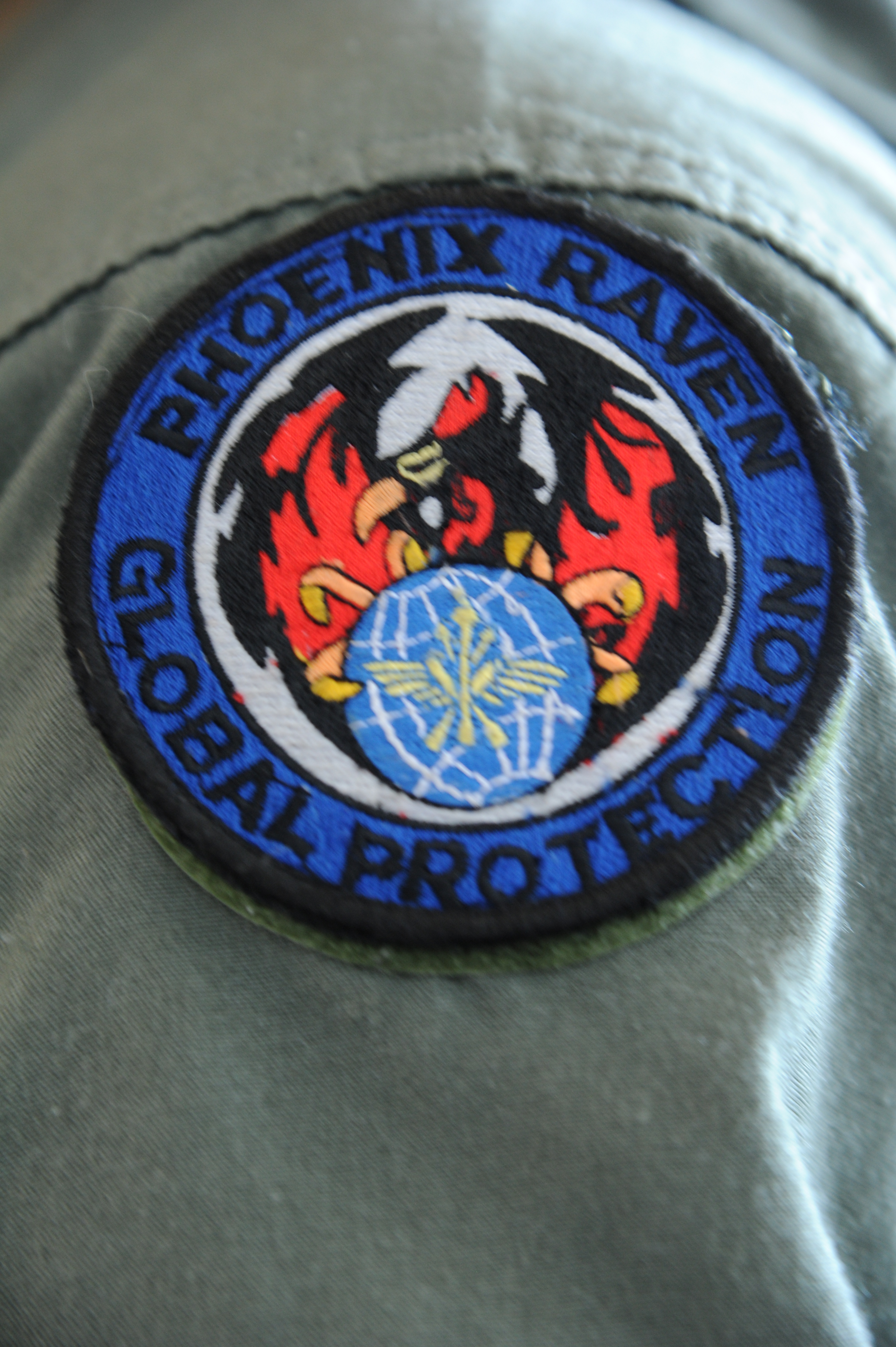
Phoenix Ravens patch

=== Specialized Units ===
– Emergency Service Teams;

– Phoenix Raven;

– Stinger Missile Program;

– The Elite Guard;

– Close Precision Engagement (CPE) teams;

– U.S. Air Force Tactical Response Force (TRF);

– Deployed Aircraft Ground Response Element (DAGRE);

– Security Forces Marine Patrol Flight;

– E4 B NEACP/NAOC Duty;

– Military Working Horse Units;

– Military working dog teams;

– Base Honor Guard.

== Uniform items ==
=== Blue beret ===
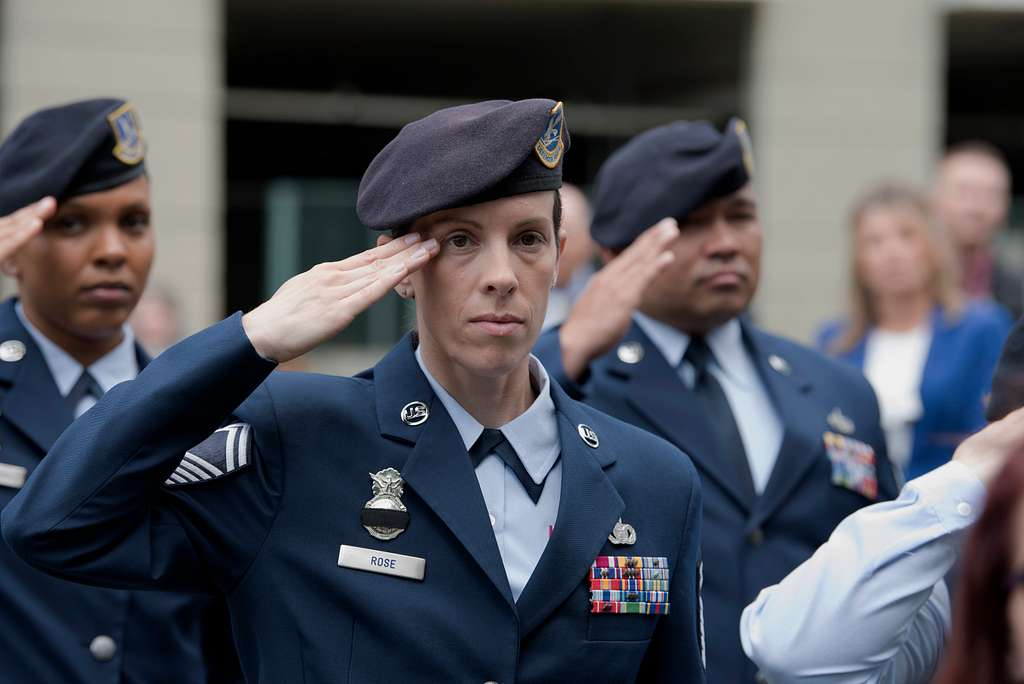
Security Forces personnel at the 29th Annual Peace Officer's Memorial Ceremony, May 2018

The Strategic Air Command's Elite Guard, an Air Police unit first established in December 1956 to provide security at USAF SAC headquarters, was the first USAF unit officially authorized to wear a blue beret (with affixed SAC patch) in 1957 as part of their distinct Elite Guard uniform. The Elite Guard's dark blue serge wool beret was worn on duty, at both guard and ceremonial functions, from 1957 onwards.

In 1966–67, during Operation Safe Side, the first Security Police beret was issued by the 1041st Security Police Squadron. This experimental and specially trained Air Base Ground Defense (ABGD) unit adopted a light blue beret displaying a falcon as its emblem. Operation Safe Side developed into the 82nd Combat Security Police Wing, consisting of three "combat security police" squadrons, but was inactivated in December 1968, ending the unofficial use of the light blue beret.

Elsewhere, during the Vietnam War, although not an authorized uniform item, some local security police commanders approved a dark blue beret similar to the SAC Elite Guard beret for their units as a less-conspicuous alternative to the official white Security Police cover for certain specialized personnel. In Thailand during the late 1960s and early 1970s, Military Working Dog handlers assigned to the 6280th SPS at the Takhli Royal Thai Air Force Base sported a dark blue beret with no insignia. Other units adopted a beret to distinguish their guards.

In 1975 Brig Gen Thomas Sadler was appointed Air Force Chief of Security Police with the task of bringing the Security Police career field into the mainstream of the Air Force. One tool he employed was recognition of members of a distinctive portion of the force, with the beret proposed as a uniform change. Significant opposition to the beret from senior colonels and Major Command (MAJCOM) Chiefs was gradually overcome by the popularity of the concept with personnel. The uniform board approved the proposal, and the beret was officially worn worldwide starting in February 1976.

The 1976 beret was worn with the MAJCOM crest of the appropriate major command to which the unit was assigned. It continued in this manner for 20 years until the forming of the Security Forces. In March 1997 the 82nd CSPW was reactivated and re-designated the 820th Security Forces Group. The heraldry of the 820th SFG then replaced the individual MAJCOM emblems as beret insignia. Enlisted personnel wear the dark blue SF beret which bears the fabric SF "Flash" depicting a falcon over an airfield with the SF motto "Defensor Fortis", literally meaning "Strong Defender" but taken to mean "defender of the force" according to the Air Force, underneath. An officer's "Flash" is similar in appearance but replaces the embroidered falcon and airfield with either metal "pin-on" or embroidered rank.

=== Security Forces flash ===
1041st Security Police Squadron Beret Flash (1967)

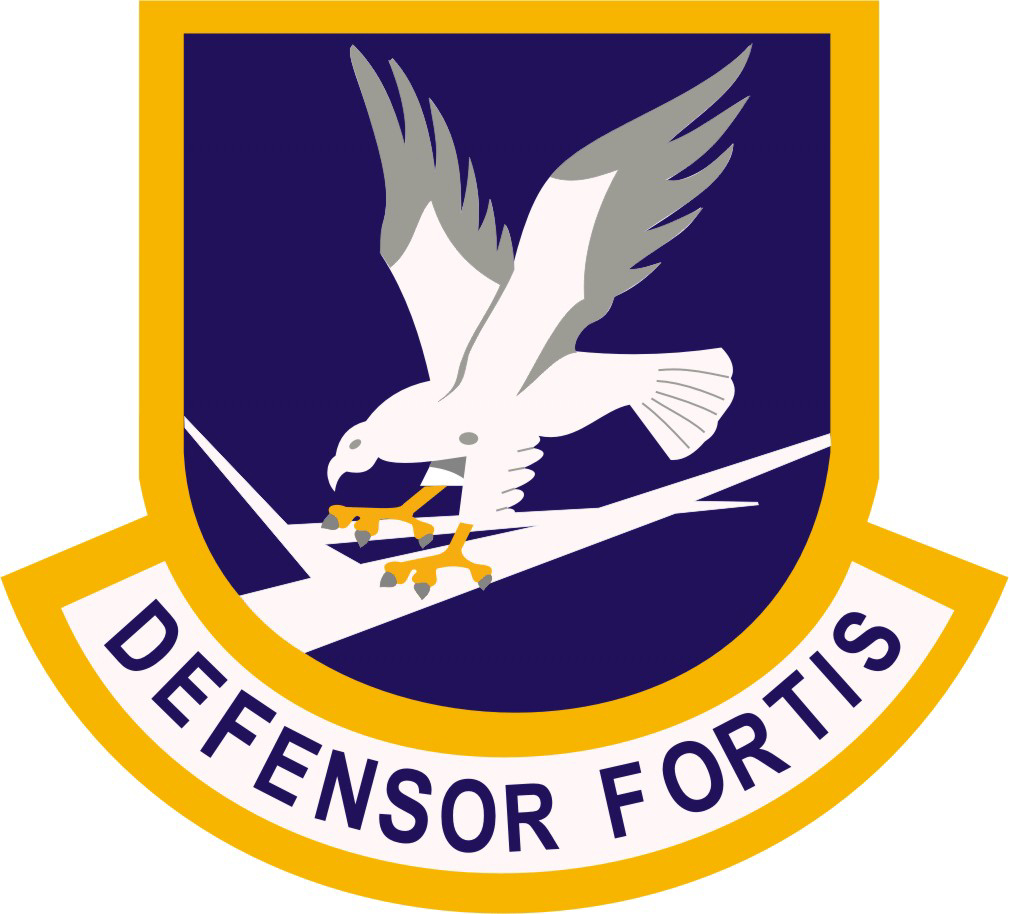
Security Forces Beret Flash (current)

Main articles:Phu Cat Air Base Security Forces and United States military beret flash

The "Falcon over crossed runways" is derived from the 1041st Security Police Squadron of Operation SAFESIDE. This unit evolved into the 82nd Combat Security Police Wing with the mission of providing the Air Force with worldwide ground defense capability and became the base model for all modern USAF Security Forces. This symbol was adopted to represent this ground defense mission.

The signature blue beret worn by USAF Security Forces shows a falcon above crossed runways. The runways represent Air Force bases and the swooping falcon symbolizes force protection. Inspired by the Strategic Air Command Elite Guard and Operation Safeside Security Police, the beret represents heritage and strength.

== Recent events ==
=== Nuclear security forces ===
Nuclear Security Forces, or "nuke troops", train constantly in small unit tactics due to their lead responsibility in fighting off clandestine, special operations forces. This has included training such as "Blue Coach", which saw Security Forces training alongside US Navy SEALs and engaging OPFOR in training, defeating their Marine Corps attackers.

=== Changes to deployment length and training ===
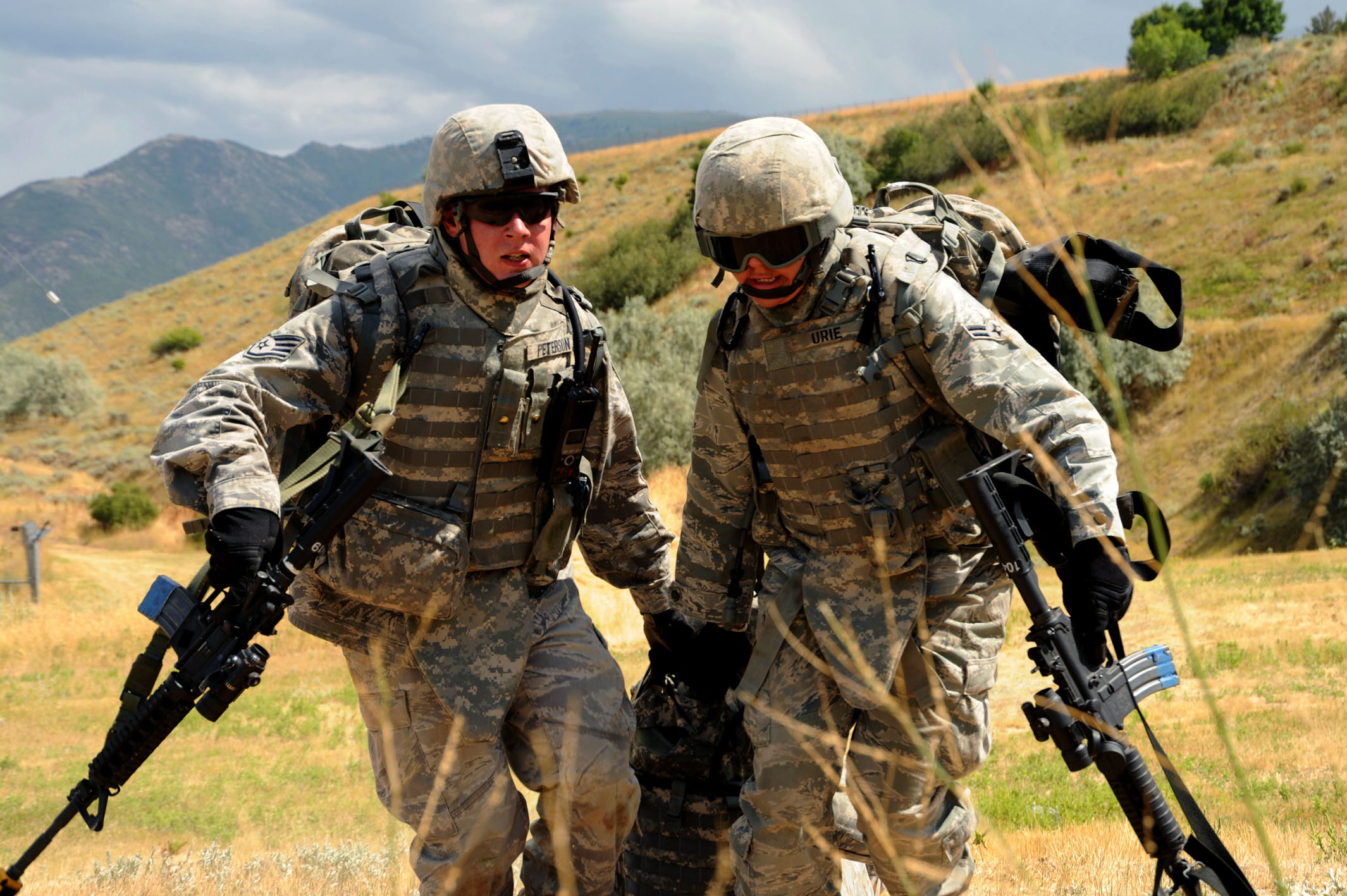
USAF Defenders training

Since March 2004 the Air Force has provided Security Forces airmen to serve in combat and in combat support roles alongside their sister service members while maintaining their Air Force identity. The Air Force calls such missions "in lieu of" taskings, or ILO for short.

In January 2006 Brig Gen Robert Holmes, Director of Security Forces and Force Protection, stated, "We want to make our airmen more proficient, and to do that we need to adapt. We're going to change our training, our tactics and our procedures and the Air Force will be better for it." Brig Gen Holmes calls these transformations a "refocus" on how Security Forces train and fight. He elaborated, "We're not in the Cold War anymore; we have to alter our mentality and our practices for today's reality. Because of the nature of the threat, our airmen are fighting the global war on terror on the front lines, and we owe it to them to provide training, equipment and resources to be effective. Essentially, Security Forces will focus on preparing for their war-fighting mission at forward locations, as well as security at a fixed installation. Our airmen are going 'outside the wire' to conduct missions and are proving successful in keeping people safe." Gen. Holmes also said one of the transformation goals is bringing security forces back in step with standard Air Force 120-day deployments. He explained, "Right now our folks are going out for 179-day rotations. Our airmen need time to reconstitute and train. So it's important to get them in line with the rest of the Air Force. We aim to do just that." Overall, Brig Gen Holmes said the changes would make Security Forces more effective and relevant to Air Force needs in the face of the current changing nature of warfare.

In November 2007 it was announced that the Air Force was going to triple the number of Security Forces personnel in Iraq and Afghanistan to back-fill Army and Marine Corps mission tasks.

In September 2010 the Air Force announced it was increasing all combat deployments to 179 days beginning in 2011. Lt. Col. Belinda Petersen, a spokeswoman for the Air Force Personnel Center, said the increase in deployment duration is an effort to "improve predictability and stability for airmen and their families." Peterson added that by revising the policy, airmen affected by the change will also "ideally" get more time at home. The dwell time for those airmen is expected to increase from 16 to 24 months. Despite these "improvements", Security Forces, civil engineers, contractors and intelligence are among the busiest in the Air Force, with six-month deployments, followed by only six months at home.

=== Frankfurt International Airport attack ===
On 2 March 2011, a senior airman assigned to the 48th Security Forces Squadron at Royal Air Force Lakenheath, England, and an Airman 1st Class assigned to the 86th Vehicle Readiness Squadron at Ramstein Air Base, Germany, were shot and killed by a 21-year-old Kosovo native of Albanian descent, at Frankfurt International Airport, Germany. The shooter's relatives in Kosovo told the Associated Press that he was a devout Muslim and German federal prosecutors said they suspect he was motivated by extremist, Islamist ideology. A U.S. law enforcement official says the shooter shouted "Allahu Akbar", or "God is Great" in Arabic, as he opened fire. The Air Force says most of the airmen attacked were part of a Security Forces team passing through Germany on their way to a deployment in Afghanistan. In addition to the two dead, two other airmen were wounded.

=== Global War on Terrorism: Operation Enduring Freedom casualties ===
Three Security Forces members have been killed in action while serving in Afghanistan during Operation Enduring Freedom. On 5 September 2013 a SSgt assigned to the 105th Base Defense Squadron while attached to the 820th Base Defense Group, was killed by small-arms fire after his unit was ambushed and attacked by insurgents outside of Bagram Airfield.

On 21 December 2015, two non-commissioned officers serving in the 105th Base Defense Squadron, part of the New York Air National Guard's 105th Airlift Wing, were killed, along with four special agents with the Department of the Air Force Office of Special Investigations, outside of Bagram Airfield by a suicide bomber utilizing a motorcycle.

=== Iraq War: Operation Iraqi Freedom casualties ===
As of 30 May 2011 12 Security Forces members have died while supporting Operation Iraqi Freedom. These personnel total 22% of all Air Force casualties during OIF.

=== Operation Freedom's Sentinel casualties ===
On 2 October 2015 during Operation Freedom's Sentinel, a senior airman and an airman 1st class were killed when their C-130J, assigned to the 774th Expeditionary Airlift Squadron, crashed on takeoff while they performed Fly Away Security Operations.

Additionally, on 21 December 2015, a team of 6 US security forces members and OSI/army individuals were KIA by a motorcycle IED, directly outside Bagram, Air Base Afghanistan in the Parwan province. Of the Security Forces members TSGT Joseph Lemm and SSGT Luis Bonacasa were KIA. The explosion was felt throughout the base. Eventually, TSGT Joseph Lemm, would have a bridge in NY named after him.

== Notable Airmen ==
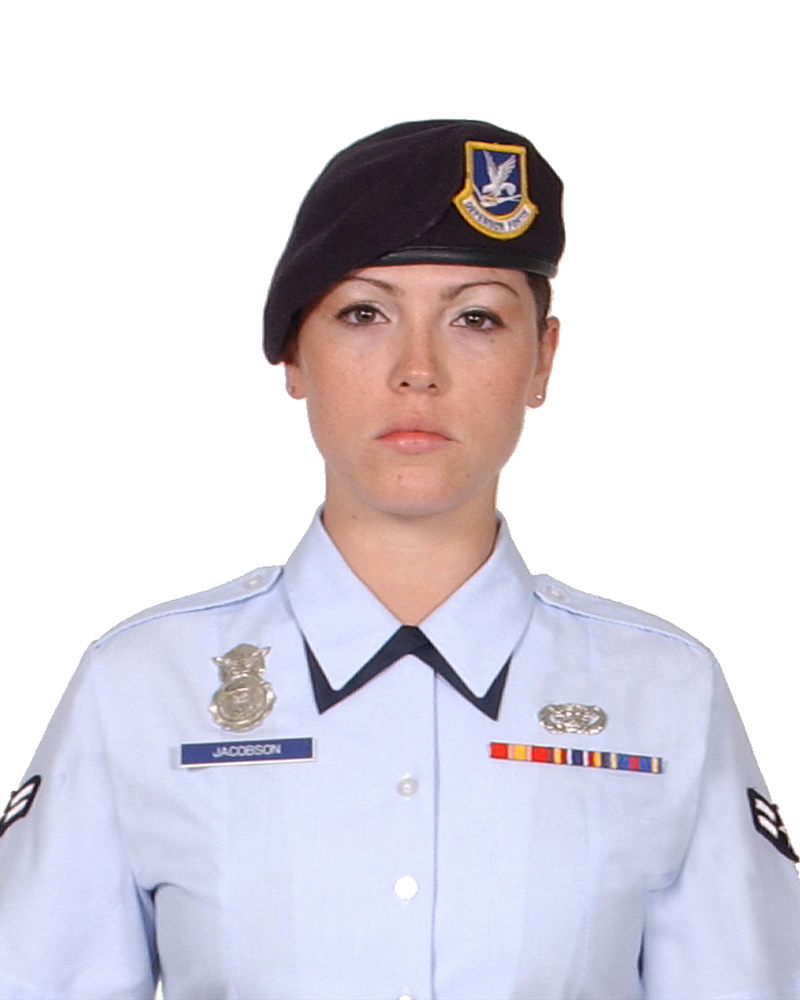
A1C Elizabeth Jacobson of the 586th Expeditionary Security Forces Squadron

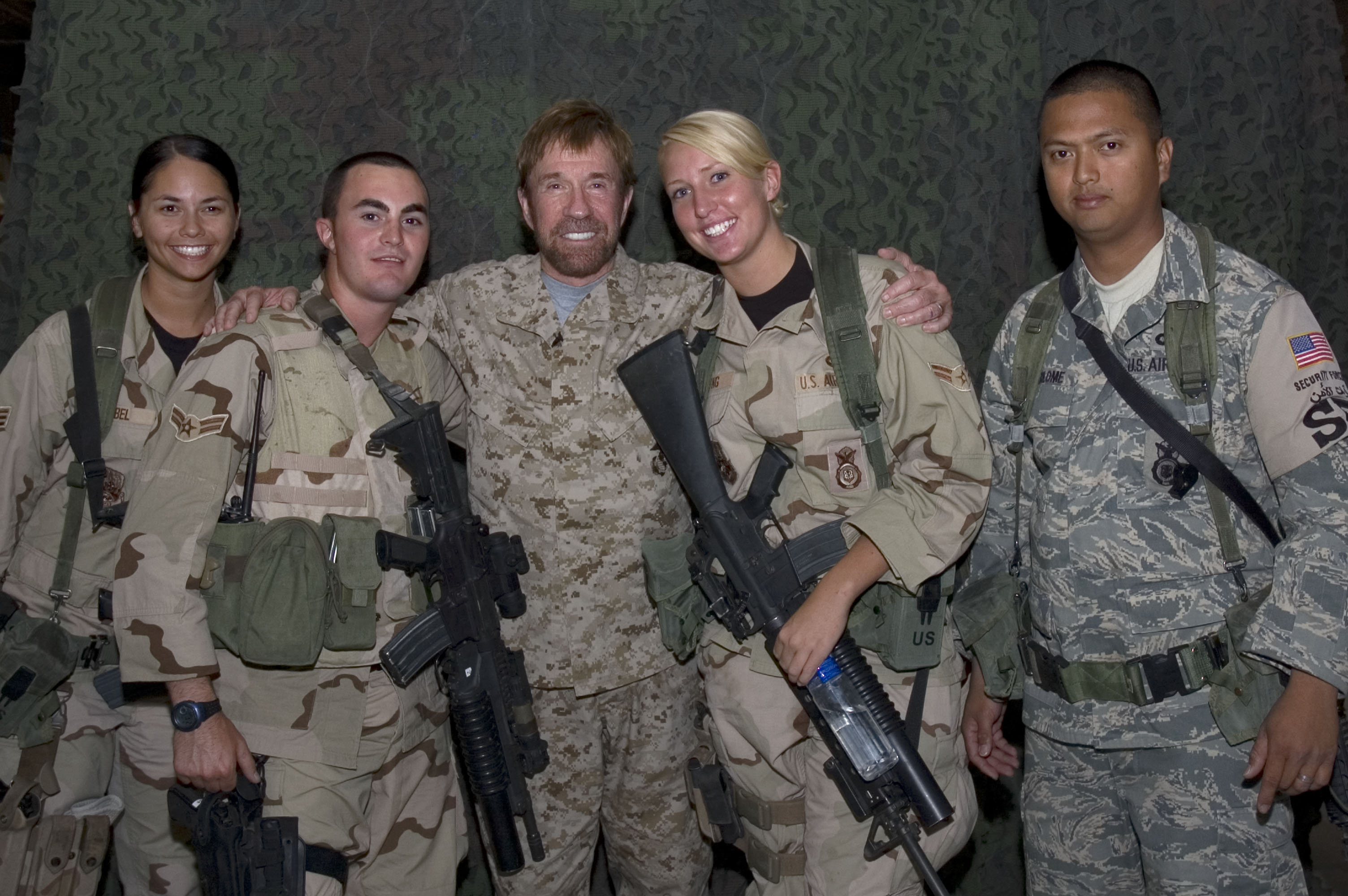
Chuck Norris, a former Air Policeman, poses with airmen of the 386th Air Expeditionary Wing's Security Forces

- Arthur "Bud" L. Andrews served as an Air Policeman for nearly 14 years. He became the seventh Chief Master Sergeant of the Air Force and served as adviser to United States Secretary of the Air Force and Chief of Staff of the Air Force on matters concerning welfare, effective utilization and progress of the enlisted members of the Air Force.
- Brian Sicnick, On 7 January 2021, a United States Capitol Police (USCP) officer, Brian Sicknick, died in a hospital the day after collapsing at the U.S. Capitol after suffering two strokes. Sicknick had responded to the attack on 6 January, during which he had been assaulted with pepper spray by two rioters. His cremated remains were laid in honor in the Capitol Rotunda on 2 February 2021, before they were buried with full honors at Arlington National Cemetery. Brian was a former USAF Security Police.
- Ashli Babbitt, who was shot in the Capital Building by a capital police officer on 6 January. She'd spent 12 years as Security Forces in the Air Force, Air National Guard, and Air Force Reserve, including deployments to Afghanistan, Iraq, Kuwait, and Qatar.
- Ben Nighthorse Campbell was an Air Policeman stationed in Korea during the Korean War. He is an American politician who served in the United States Senate and the United States House of Representatives. For some time he was the only Native American serving in the U.S. Congress.
- Robert D. Gaylor served as the fifth Chief Master Sergeant of the Air Force.
- Elizabeth Nicole Jacobson, a member of the United States Air Force Security Forces, was killed in action in the Iraq War in 2005. She was the first female U.S. airman killed in the line of duty in support of Operation Iraqi Freedom and the first Air Force Security Forces member killed in conflict since the Vietnam War.
- Bernard James, NBA player, served as a security forces specialist assigned to the 9th Security Forces Squadron at Beale Air Force Base. During his service he was deployed to Iraq, Qatar and Afghanistan.
- Chuck Norris, actor and martial-arts instructor, was an Air Policeman stationed in Osan Air Base, South Korea, and March Air Force Base, California, during his enlistment from 1958 to 1962. While stationed at Osan he acquired the nickname "Chuck" and began his training in Tang Soo Do (tangsudo).
- Richard Pennington, former police chief for the Atlanta Police Department and New Orleans Police Department and Assistant Chief of the Metropolitan Police Department of the District of Columbia. Pennington served as a security policeman during the Vietnam War.
- Hilliard A. Wilbanks, who received the Medal of Honor during the Vietnam War, served as an air policeman before becoming a pilot.

== See also ==
- List of United States Air Force security forces squadrons
- Department of the Air Force Police
- 732 ESFS/DET-3
- United States Army Military Police Corps
- United States Navy Master-at-arms
- Department of the Air Force Office of Special Investigations
- United States Air Force Security Forces Shield
- 820th Base Defense Group
- Master-at-arms (United States Navy)
- Protective Services Battalion
- Pentagon Force Protection Agency

=== Other countries ===
- RAAF Airfield Defence Guards – Australia
- Fusiliers Commandos de l'Air – France
- Air Gendarmerie – France
- German Air Force Regiment – Germany
- RNZAF Security Forces – New Zealand
- Swedish Air Force Rangers – Sweden
- Polícia Aérea – Portugal
- Sri Lanka Air Force Regiment – Sri Lanka
- Royal Air Force Regiment – United Kingdom
- Royal Air Force Police – United Kingdom

== Bibliography ==
- Pinckney, Kali (2009). Defensor Fortis: The History of the Air Force Military Police, Air Police, Security Police, and the Security Forces. Lexington, Kentucky: PinckTank Publishing. ISBN 978-0-615-32829-4.
