= List of United States Air Force Security Forces squadrons =

Squadrons of the United States Air Force Security Forces, with locations:

Security Forces Squadrons
Squadron	Location
1st Special Operations Security Forces Squadron	Hurlburt Field
2d Security Forces Squadron	Barksdale Air Force Base
4th Security Forces Squadron	Seymour Johnson Air Force Base
5th Security Forces Squadron	Minot Air Force Base
6th Security Forces Squadron	MacDill Air Force Base
7th Security Forces Squadron	Dyess Air Force Base
8th Security Forces Squadron	Kunsan Air Base
9th Security Forces Squadron	Beale Air Force Base
10th Security Forces Squadron	US Air Force Academy
11th Security Forces Squadron	Andrews AFB
12th Security Forces Squadron	Randolph Air Force Base
14th Security Forces Squadron	Columbus Air Force Base
17th Security Forces Squadron	Goodfellow Air Force Base
18th Security Forces Squadron	Kadena Air Base
19th Security Forces Squadron	Little Rock Air Force Base
20th Security Forces Squadron	Shaw Air Force Base
21st Security Forces Squadron	Peterson Space Force Base
22nd Security Forces Squadron	McConnell Air Force Base
27th Special Operations Security Forces Squadron	Cannon Air Force Base
28th Security Forces Squadron	Ellsworth Air Force Base
30th Security Forces Squadron	Vandenberg Space Force Base
31st Security Forces Squadron	Aviano Air Base
35th Security Forces Squadron	Misawa Air Base
36th Security Forces Squadron	Andersen Air Force Base
39th Security Forces Squadron	Incirlik Air Base
42nd Security Forces Squadron	Maxwell Air Force Base
45th Security Forces Squadron	Patrick Space Force Base
47th Security Forces Squadron	Laughlin Air Force Base
48th Security Forces Squadron	RAF Lakenheath
49th Security Forces Squadron	Holloman Air Force Base
50th Security Forces Squadron	Schriever Space Force Base
51st Security Forces Squadron	Osan Air Base
52nd Security Forces Squadron	Spangdahlem Air Base
55th Security Forces Squadron	Offutt Air Force Base
56th Security Forces Squadron	Luke Air Force Base
60th Security Forces Squadron	Travis Air Force Base
65th Security Forces Squadron	Lajes Air Base
66th Security Forces Squadron	Hanscom Air Force Base
71st Security Forces Squadron	Vance Air Force Base
72nd Security Forces Squadron	Tinker Air Force Base
75th Security Forces Squadron	Hill Air Force Base
78th Security Forces Squadron	Robins Air Force Base
81st Security Forces Squadron	Keesler Air Force Base
82nd Security Forces Squadron	Sheppard Air Force Base
86th Security Forces Squadron	Ramstein Air Base
87th Security Forces Squadron	McGuire AFB
88th Security Forces Squadron	Wright-Patterson Air Force Base
90th Security Forces Group	FE Warren Air Force Base
91st Security Forces Group	Minot Air Force Base
92nd Security Forces Squadron	Fairchild Air Force Base
96th Security Forces Squadron	Eglin Air Force Base
97th Security Forces Squadron	Altus Air Force Base
99th Security Forces Squadron	Nellis Air Force Base
100th Security Forces Squadron	RAF Mildenhall
101st Security Forces Squadron	Bangor Air National Guard Base
102nd Security Forces Squadron	Joint Base Cape Cod
103rd Security Forces Squadron	Bradley Air National Guard Base
104th Security Forces Squadron	Barnes Air National Guard Base
105th Security Forces Squadron	Stewart Air National Guard Base
106th Security Forces Squadron	Francis S. Gabreski Air National Guard Base
107th Security Forces Squadron	Niagara Falls Joint Air Reserve Station
110th Security Forces Squadron	Battle Creek Air National Guard Base
121st Security Forces Squadron	Rickenbacker Air National Guard Base
122nd Security Forces Squadron	122nd Fighter Wing
136th Security Forces Squadron	NAS JRB Fort Worth
139th Security Forces Squadron	Rosecrans Air National Guard Base
141st Security Forces Squadron	Fairchild Air Force Base
143rd Security Forces Squadron	Quonset Point Air National Guard Station
145th Security Forces Squadron	Charlotte Air National Guard Base
151st Security Forces Squadron	Roland R. Wright Air National Guard Base Salt Lake City
154th Security Forces Squadron	Hawaii Air National Guard Base
155th Security Forces Squadron	Lincoln Air National Guard Base
156th Security Forces Squadron	Muñiz Air National Guard Base
157th Security Forces Squadron	Pease Air National Guard Base
158th Security Forces Squadron	Burlington Air National Guard Base
162nd Security Forces Squadron	Arizona Air National Guard Base
165th Security Forces Squadron	Savannah Air National Guard Base
174th Security Forces Squadron	Hancock Field Air National Guard Base
178th Security Forces Squadron	Springfield Air National Guard Base
179th Security Forces Squadron	Mansfield Lahm Air National Guard Base
180th Security Forces Squadron	Toledo Air National Guard Base
184th Security Forces Squadron	McConnell Air Force Base
185th Security Forces Squadron	Sioux City Air National Guard Base
186th Security Forces Squadron	Key Field Air National Guard Base
190th Security Forces Squadron	Forbes Field Air National Guard Base
193d Special Operations Security Forces Squadron	Harrisburg Air National Guard Base
194th Security Forces Squadron	Camp Murray Air Guard Station
204th Security Forces Squadron	Fort Bliss
219th Security Forces Squadron	Minot Air Force Base
301st Security Forces Squadron	NAS JRB Fort Worth
319th Security Forces Squadron	Grand Forks Air Force Base
325th Security Forces Squadron	Tyndall Air Force Base
341st Security Forces Group	Malmstrom Air Force Base
343d Security Forces Squadron	Joint Base San Antonio-Lackland
354th Security Forces Squadron	Eielson Air Force Base
355th Security Forces Squadron	Davis-Monthan Air Force Base
366th Security Forces Squadron	Mountain Home Air Force Base
374th Security Forces Squadron	Yokota Air Base
375th Security Forces Squadron	Scott Air Force Base
377th Security Forces Squadron	Kirtland Air Force Base
412th Security Forces Squadron	Edwards Air Force Base
435th Security Forces Squadron	Ramstein Air Base
436th Security Forces Squadron	Dover Air Force Base
445th Security Forces Squadron	Wright-Patterson Air Force Base
446th Security Forces Squadron	McChord AFB
460th Security Forces Squadron	Buckley Space Force Base
502d Security Forces Squadron	Joint Base San Antonio
509th Security Forces Squadron	Whiteman Air Force Base
569th U.S. Forces Police Squadron	Vogelweh AS
610th Security Forces Squadron	NAS JRB Fort Worth
627th Security Forces Squadron	McChord AFB
633d Security Forces Squadron	Langley AFB
647th Security Forces Squadron	Hickam AFB
673d Security Forces Squadron	Elmendorf AFB
736th Security Forces Squadron	Andersen Air Force Base
802d Security Forces Squadron	Joint Base San Antonio-Lackland
811th Security Forces Squadron	Andrews AFB
820th Base Defense Group	Moody Air Force Base
821st Security Forces Squadron	Thule Air Base
902d Security Forces Squadron	Joint Base San Antonio-Randolph
920th Security Forces Squadron	Patrick Space Force Base

== See also ==
- List of United States Air Force squadrons
