= 732 (disambiguation) =

732 is the year AD 732.

732 may also refer to:

- 732 BC
- 732 (number)

== Military ==
- 732 Naval Air Squadron, a former Royal Navy Fleet Air Arm squadron
- 732nd Air Expeditionary Group, a currently inactive unit of the United States Air Force
- 732nd Airlift Squadron, a unit of the United States Air Force
- 732nd Bombardment Squadron, a former unit of the United States Air Force
- 732nd Expeditionary Security Forces Squadron, a former unit of the United States Air Force Security Forces
- 732nd Operations Group, a unit of the United States Air Force
- USS Alaska (SSBN-732), a United States Navy ballistic missile submarine

== Transportation ==
- Boeing 737-200, a variant of the twin-engine jet airliner, commonly shortened as B732 or 732
- Karosa B 732, a transit bus model built in Czechoslovakia
- March 732, a British Formula 2 racing car

== Other uses ==
- Area code 732, a telephone area code in New Jersey, United States
- 732 Tjilaki, a main belt asteroid
- ISO 732, an international standard for medium-format roll photographic film
- Washington Initiative 732, a proposed carbon tax initiative
