= Phu Cat Air Base Security Forces =

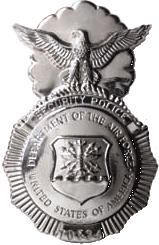
USAF Security Police badge

Phu Cat Air Base Security Forces of the United States Air Force were Air Police and Security Police squadrons responsible for the air base ground defense of Phù Cát Air Base in South Vietnam during the Vietnam War.

Phu Cat AB was the field test site for the six-month combat evaluation of the 1041st USAF Security Police Squadron (Test) from 16 January to 4 July 1967. The 1041st patrolled 26 miles of outer perimeter under Project Safe Side to evaluate the feasibility of developing a USAF Air Base Ground Defense (ABGD) force. Its experiences were a direct precursor to the development of the Security Force-concept in use today by the USAF.

Units primarily responsible for base security were the 37th Security Police Squadron between 1 August 1966 and 31 March 1970, and the 12th Security Police Squadron from 1 April 1970 to 17 November 1971, when its parent 12th Tactical Fighter Wing was inactivated. These squadrons were periodically augmented by sections of "combat security police" on temporary duty in SVN under the designation 821st Combat Security Police Squadron. After the drawdown of U.S. forces at Phù Cát AB in 1971, the base and its security were turned over to the Republic of Vietnam Air Force.

== History ==
On 1 August, Capt Robert M. Sullivan and 53 air policemen, including six sentry dog/handler teams, were transferred from the 366th Air Police Squadron at Phan Rang Air Base to be the cadre for the newly activated 37th Air Police Squadron at Qui Nhon. Their first assignment was to escort 63 engineers of the 554th and 555th Civil Engineer Squadrons to Phù Cát, and then to assume security of the base site. The RED HORSE contingent constructed a camp for the 819th CES (Heavy Repair), tasked to build the base but still training at Forbes Air Force Base, Kansas. A 55-man advance party from the 819th CES arrived directly from the United States on 6 August, followed by the entire squadron a month later, and began construction of all vertical structures on the base.

19 September 1966 marked activation of 37th Combat Support Group, slated to be a support component of the 37th Tactical Fighter Wing. During construction, internal base security was provided by the severely understrength 37th APS, then having only 240 APs assigned and forced to augment its ranks with 100 non-security airmen from the 37th Combat Support Group and 162 from the 819th CES. The 1041st USAF Security Police Squadron (Test), an experimental light infantry-type air police unit, deployed to Phu Cat in the first half of 1967 to increase ground defense security under Operation Safe Side.

=== Operation Safe Side ===
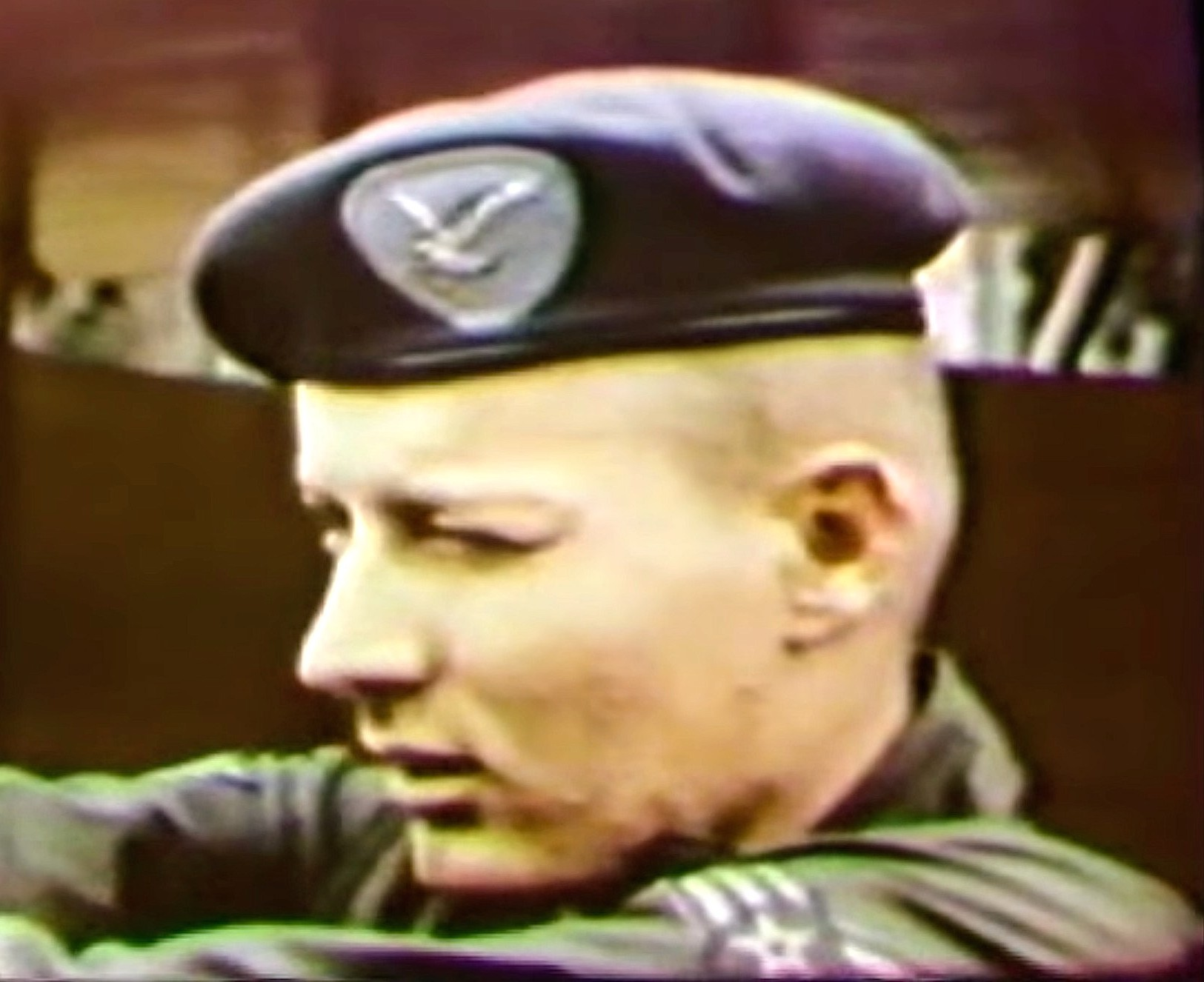
A Security Policeman with the 1041st SPS (Test) conducting pistol training, wearing the unit's unique beret and flash

Project "Safe Side," circa 1968 (6:03)
Creation of the 1041st SPS

250 men assigned to the 1041st SPS (Test) trained in patrolling and intelligence-gathering for 15 weeks (5 September to 16 December 1966) at Schofield Barracks, Hawaii, under a 35-man cadre, 23 of whom trained at the US Army Ranger School but only four of whom were fully qualified as instructors. This necessitated on-the-job training at Phu Cat AB for the 226 who completed the initial course.

At Schofield Barracks the organizational structure of the 1041st was finalized, consisting of a squadron headquarters (an officer and 38 enlisted men) for administration and evaluation; and an observation and surveillance flight (an officer and 37 EM), a close combat flight (two officers and 78 EM), a weapons support flight (one officer and 31 EM), an operations section (one officer and 21 EM), and a scout dog section (15 enlisted men and nine dogs) as combat elements. Vehicles assigned the unit were 28 M151A1 Jeeps, seven M37 ¾ ton trucks, two M35 2½ ton cargo trucks, and three armored personnel carriers.

Its basic tactical units were 16 six-man fire teams, each equipped with an M60 machine gun and a grenade launcher. The squadron was proficient in all infantry weapons including mortars. It was equipped with three own weapons-mounted M113 armored personnel carriers (APC) for off-road mobility, supplemented by helicopters. A Tactical Security Support Equipment (TSSE) system consisting of buried seismic detectors and sensors called Multiple Conductor Intrusion Devices enhanced its capability of monitoring intrusions. Armory and headquarters personnel were trained in demolition.

During its 179-day tour at Phù Cát, the 1041st conducted 651 patrols, 155 ambushes, and destroyed more than 350 tunnels and fortifications without suffering any fatalities. The Safe Side evaluation and findings report, along with a functional study conducted concurrently by the Chief of Staff of the Air Force, recommended that the Air Force create ten combat security police squadrons, each with 21 officers and 538 enlisted men, organized into three security flights of 167 men per flight, and detailed a TO&E. USAF accepted the organizational model but created only three squadrons.

=== Threat response after July 1967 ===
Affecting all units and personnel stationed at Phù Cát AB was the threat of communist mortar and rocket attacks. Until 1969 the base was relatively secure from stand-off and sapper attack because of the number of South Korean (ROK) and US Army units patrolling the area. Using the operations plan developed by the 1041st SP Squadron, the 37th Air Police Squadron, redesignated as a "Security Police" unit in June 1967, had its authorized strength brought up to 396 men to provide inside-the-perimeter base security, with approximately 80 of those assigned to law enforcement or administrative duties.

The 37th SPS (redesignated the 12th SPS on 1 April 1970) reorganized its three TO&E weapons system security flights into tailored units dubbed "Ranger," "Tiger," and "Cobra" Flights, with approximately two-thirds of the available manpower (240 men) assigned to the night duty Cobra Flight. Cobra Flight scheduled overlapping night shifts to optimize coverage, supplemented by a non-standard patrol/mortar section ("Sniper-Ambush team") created within the flight. Initially trained by the 1041st during its phaseout, it also conducted patrols outside the air base perimeter and used armored vehicles for blocking forces and ammunition resupply. As base units were either withdrawn or downsized, security patrols gradually decreased.

The base experienced three sapper attacks that penetrated its perimeter between 22 February 1969 and 4 April 1970, and thirteen stand-off rocket and mortar attacks between 17 June 1969 and 24 February 1971, resulting in sixteen damaged aircraft, two deaths, and 28 wounded. All of the sapper attacks were defeated by security forces, resulting in the deaths of six NVA sappers and the capture of one. In the early morning of 12 February 1971 two security policemen of a 12th SPS security alert team were killed when a command-detonated explosive device manufactured from C-4 explosive destroyed their jeep as they were patrolling just outside the northern perimeter of the base.

Between 9 September 1969 and 1 February 1972, a heavy weapons and small unit tactics school (initially, from 5 May 1969, the Seventh Air Force Mortar School) was operated at Phù Cát AB by the 821st Combat Security Police Squadron and later the 35th Security Police Squadron. On 17 November 1969, the law enforcement section of the 37th SPS opened the first Correctional Custodial Facility in the Seventh Air Force.

== Phù Cát Air Base ground defense plan ==
The air base ground defense plan for Phù Cát AB consisted of a three-zone sector plan. This was closely adapted from the "three-ring model of defense in depth" tested by Safe Side.

The outermost or preventive perimeter zone, a barrier and sensor defense generally located along the perimeter of the installation, consisted of a single line of triple-strand concertina wire strung along a 16 kilometer-long "main line of resistance" (MLR), with areas in front of the wire protected by minefields. Between the spring of 1969 and 1970, the 485th GEEIA (Ground Electronics Engineering Installation Agency) Squadron and Air Force Systems Command tested Project Safe Look at Phù Cát AB. Between the spring of 1969 and 1970, the 485th GEEIA (Ground Electronics Engineering Installation Agency) Squadron and Air Force Systems Command tested Project Safe Look at Phù Cát AB.

This prototype Perimeter Detection and Surveillance System (PDSS) had 2 buried lines. One was a pressure-sensitive line several hundred yards long. Westinghouse. The other buried line was approximately 40 yards inside the pressure line and was a metal detection system. Honeywell Multi-Concealed Instrumentation Detection System. Both were buried in front of the north defense sector and monitored from a tower, Tango 13.

These were integrated in the Fall of 1969, with the AN/PPS-5/PPS-12 ground surveillance radars already in use by the USAF. The radar system worked well with the exception of high wind conditions but could detect the difference of movements of animals (Wart Hogs, Jungle Cats, and Water Buffalo) vs human movements. It could detect specific numbers and direction and was highly instrumental in detecting enemy attempts of penetrating the perimeter.

The pressure/metal detection system worked well under optimum conditions, but suffered high-maintenance costs and degraded performance in heavy rain. The pressure/metal detection system had not been field-tested in the United States, and because the intended combat test did not result in many hostile contacts, 37th SPS contributed approximately 12,500-man-hours simulating infiltrations for tests of the sensors. The high maintenance cost, waste of security man-hours, and drawdown of U.S. forces in Vietnam for whom the system was intended resulted in its discontinuation in June of 1970. Programmed perimeter defense plans for complete fencing and installation of permanent lighting were never brought to fruition. Key areas of the perimeter were defended using night vision devices and 130 portable floodlights.

The second or secondary defense zone, a penetration containment defense (interception and neutralization by mobile reaction teams), consisted of a line of twenty observation towers ("Tango"s), supplemented by observation posts built on higher elevations, known as "rook towers" ("Romeo"s). Each tower had an armor-protected weapons-mounted observation platform 20 feet above ground level for 360-degree observation, but in 1969 a 60-foot tower ("Tango 19") was erected near the north end of the runway at the rotation point for departing fighter-bombers. Sentry dog/handler posts ("Kilos"s) were assigned forward of the tower (and later bunker) line to patrol between the first and second defense lines to provide early warning of intrusion.

At its peak strength in 1970, Phù Cát AB's military war dog section had 66 dogs authorized, and 45 dogs assigned. The sentry dog patrols were supported in the secondary defense zone by motorized Security Alert Teams (SATs or "Sierra"s), six during daylight hours and nine after dark. These two- or three-man patrols used radio-equipped M151 "jeeps", each mounting an M60 machine gun, to investigate intrusion alerts, and beginning in 1969 employed two XM-706 armored cars (dubbed Rubber Duckies) and three M113 APCs previously obtained from the Army by the 1041st SPS for ammunition resupply and blocking force missions.

Both types of armored vehicles mounted .50 caliber machine guns. In 1969 the 37th SPS obtained two GAU-2B/A 7.62mm miniguns from the special operations squadron detachment at Phù Cát for mounting on its armored vehicles, and in December 1969 deployed vehicle- and tripod-mounted XM174 40mm automatic grenade launchers fed by 12-round magazines. Near the end of 1969 much of the secondary zone was sprayed with herbicide, then bulldozed, almost completely eradicating vegetation but also eliminating concealment for the dog/handler teams.

The innermost or close-in defense zone, a point defense of priority assets (controlled entry and static defense), consisted of low profile sandbag-protected bunkers ("Bravo"s) for anti-sapper point defense of the flight line and personnel areas. However small arms fire restrictions in the free-fire areas resulted in the relocation of most bunkers to near the MLR in mid-1969, in an ultimately futile hope of integrating the bunkers with the proposed fence and lighting program. Cobra Flight maintained five M29 81mm mortar pits and a fire direction center, primarily for illumination purposes, and each observation tower was equipped with an azimuth board. At least one M42 Duster, a self-propelled dual-40 mm air defense vehicle crewed by Army personnel, provided ground support for the bunker line along the west side of the perimeter.

Each flight maintained a Quick Reaction Team (QRT) of six to thirteen security policemen to respond to penetrations of the perimeter, transported in trucks storing weaponry needed. The security force was supplemented by manpower augmentation ("augmentees" officially; "Augie Doggies" familiarly) of approximately 100 non-security police airmen, and from August 1969 to December 1969 by two 33-man sections of combat security police deployed on temporary duty to Vietnam.

Nightly air cover was provided by an orbiting AC-47 Spooky gunship, which patrolled mainly the "rocket belt" surrounding the air base, but operational control was not given local commanders. Because Phù Cát never experienced a direct infantry attack, the AC-47 patrol was commonly diverted to priority missions resulting in a lapse of coverage of up to 50 minutes while a replacement AC-47 was scrambled from Nha Trang.

A forward observation post was maintained outside the perimeter, approximately one mile from the flight line, atop Hill 151, also known as "Bordner Hill," in bunkers and trenches previously held by Korean troops. A four-man security team was flown by HH-43 Pedro helicopters of the rescue detachment to the position, known in the defense plan by its voice call sign Oregon, for seven-day rotations.

Beginning in April 1969 the intelligence section of the 37th SPS conducted aerial reconnaissance of the perimeter twice a day aboard an HH-43 or a Cessna O-1 Bird Dog forward air control aircraft of the 21st Tactical Air Support Squadron. Command and control of all operations, both security and law enforcement, was conducted by Central Security Control (CSC), located in a controlled access building behind the Base Operations facility on the flight line.

In addition to USAF base defense personnel, South Korean forces provided additional support. The artillery brigade of the Capital Division maintained a base camp adjacent to the Phù Cát AB, and the 2nd Battalion of its 1st Cavalry Regiment included the base in its Tactical Area of Responsibility (TAOR). The battalion's 8th Company had its camp within the western sector of the base and conducted patrolling outside the perimeter.
