= Strategic Air Command Elite Guard =

American military unit

Strategic Air Command Elite Guards
- SAC Shield, worn on the beret of the Elite Guard
- Active: As Air Police (1956–1966); As Security Police (1966–1992)
- Country: United States
- Branch: United States Air Force
- Type: Military police
- Role: Military law enforcement Ground Defense
- Part of: U.S. Department of Defense; U.S. Department of the Air Force
- Motto: Defensor Fortis
- Equipment: .45 M1911 pistol; chrome-plated.38-caliber revolver with special bone-handled grip
- Engagements: Cold War

Commanders
- Notable commanders: General Curtis E. LeMay General Horace M. Wade First Lieutenant Raymond L. Balcer

Insignia
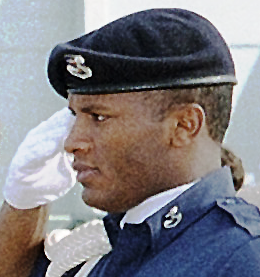
- SAC's Elite Guard Beret with SAC Shield (1984)

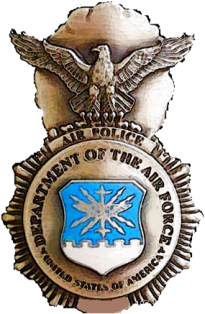
- Original Air Police Shield

The SAC Elite Guard was a United States Air Force Security Police unit established in December 1956 to provide security at the headquarters of the Strategic Air Command (SAC) of the U.S. Air Force, as well as personal protection for the Commander and Vice Commander of SAC.

Established by order of General Curtis E. LeMay, the unit was initially known as Detachment "A" of the 3902nd Air Police Squadron at Offutt Air Force Base. With end of the Cold War in 1992 the Strategic Air Command Elite Guards were formed into the United States Air Force Security Police and later merged in 1997 into the new United States Air Force Security Forces, which exists to this day.

== Formation ==
The Elite Guard was formed under a signed order from General Curtis LeMay, who was instrumental in modernizing USAF security forces in general and the Strategic Air Command in particular. At the creation of the USAF in 1947, aircraft were normally guarded by security detachments formed from airdrome or air base squadrons. In many cases "guard duty" was a detail or extra duty and not a full-time job, often given out as punishment to underperforming personnel. Security and weapons training was minimal or nonexistent. During his initial inspection of the SAC strategic bomber fleet at Offutt Air Force Base in 1948, LeMay reported that at one hangar he found an Air Police sentry on duty "armed only with a ham sandwich". The exigencies of the Korean War imposed additional delays in retraining and reequipping SAC personnel. Despite these problems, LeMay continued to press for improvements in air base and SAC command security, and proposed the formation of an elite Air Police unit in charge of SAC command security at Offutt Air Force Base. In 1956, after the existing SAC Provost Marshal failed to act with sufficient dispatch in forming the new unit, LeMay replaced him, instituting changes in SAC security force structure that resulted in the creation of the Elite Guard in December that year.

== Mission, organization, and equipment ==
The Elite Guards' mission was threefold. Primarily, Detachment "A" would be responsible to provide stringent security for SAC Headquarters and its resources. The second portion of their mission was to provide personal protection for the Commander and Vice Commander in chief of the Strategic Air Command and their assembled staff. It also had a third, ceremonial function: acting as an official Strategic Air command representative at military and civic functions requiring military unit participation, with an official drill team.

In 1957 General LeMay, General Horace M. Wade (SAC director of personnel), and the Commander for the 3902nd Air Police Squadron personally selected and procured a distinctive uniform. The initial summer uniform was a tan herringbone twill (khaki) trousers and shirts, which was changed in 1960 to a dark blue shirt and trousers. The winter uniform included a dark blue Eisenhower jacket. White silk scarves, blue canvas web belt with chrome buckle and SAC crest, a white lanyard on the right shoulder, white gloves, and black jump boots with white laces completed the unique Guard uniform. Instead of the then-standard .45 M1911 pistol, at General LeMay's insistence the Guardsmen were armed with a special bone-handled, chrome-plated .38-caliber revolver secured in a black leather, open-top, cross-draw holster. The new uniform included a blue serge wool beret with affixed SAC patch, making the Elite Guard the first Air Force unit authorized (from 1957 onwards) to wear the blue beret. The blue beret became the prototype for the headgear later introduced for wear by all Air Force security forces.

Through the years, changes in Air Force dress standards necessitated changing the colors and combination of this unique uniform. While the drill team was disbanded in 1969, the guard's primary mission continued with added responsibility for the monthly Changing of the Guard ceremony, funeral details, civic events and formal military functions.

The Strategic Air Command, a USAF command, stood down in 1992, with the unified United States Strategic Command replacing it.

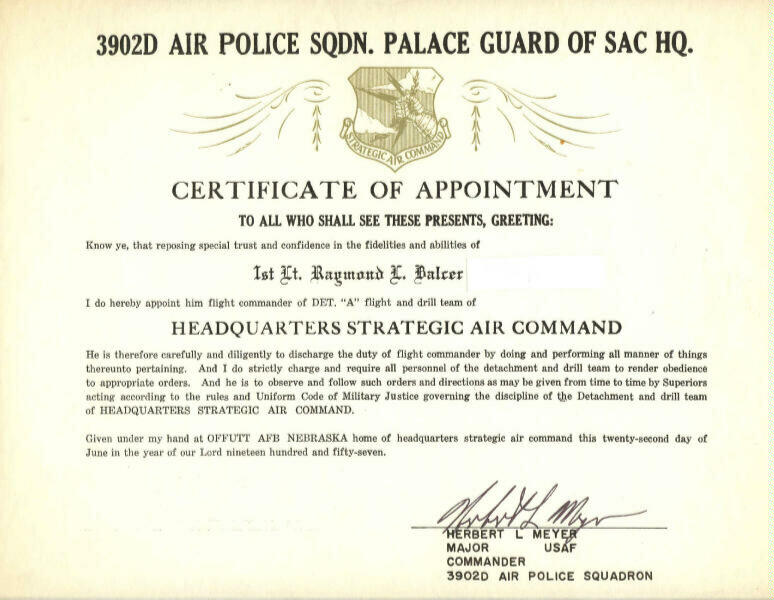
First Lieutenant Raymond L. Balcer's Appointment as the first commander of the 3902nd Air Police Squadron
