= Smith & Wesson Model 15 =

Revolver

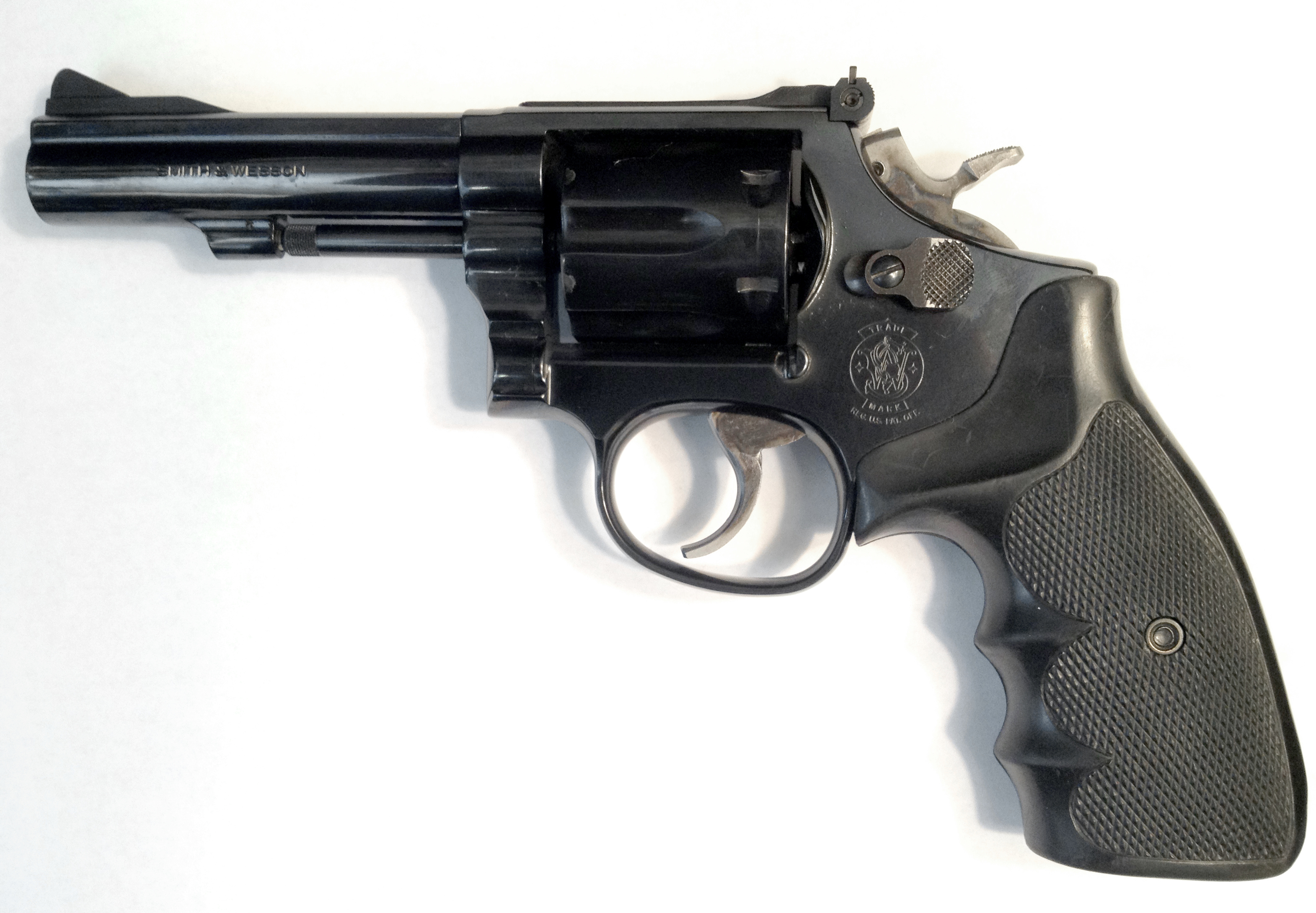
- Smith & Wesson Model 15
- Type: Revolver
- Place of origin: United States

Production history
- Manufacturer: Smith & Wesson
- Produced: 1949–1999 (main production run); 2001–2002 (Heritage Series limited run); 2011–2013 (Classics Revolvers)
- Variants: Model 67 (stainless steel)

Specifications
- Mass: 34 oz (960 g)
- Length: 9 1/8 in (23 cm)
- Barrel length: 4 in (10 cm)
- Cartridge: .38 Special
- Feed system: 6-round cylinder
- Sights: Open sights

The Smith & Wesson Model 15, initially the Smith & Wesson K-38 Combat Masterpiece, is a six-shot double-action revolver with adjustable open sights produced by Smith & Wesson on the medium-size "K" frame. It is chambered for the .38 Special cartridge and is fitted with a 4-inch (100 mm) barrel, though additional barrel options have been offered at various times during its production. It is essentially a shorter barrel version of the Smith & Wesson Model 14 and an adjustable-sight version of the seminal Smith & Wesson Model 10 with target shooting features.

The Model 15 was introduced in 1949 as the K-38 Combat Masterpiece. It was renamed the Model 15 in 1957, when all Smith & Wesson revolvers were given numerical model numbers. The Model 15's main production run lasted 50 years until 1999, when it was discontinued for approximately a decade, with only brief limited runs in the Heritage Series line. In 2011, a retooled Model 15 was re-released under the Classics Revolvers line, remaining in production until 2013.

== History ==
The Smith & Wesson K-38 Combat Masterpiece Revolver Model 15 is a derivative of the classic 1899 K-frame (medium frame) Military and Police .38 S&W Special (a.k.a. .38 Special) six-shot double-action revolver. The M&P underwent steady evolution throughout the 20th century and S&W spun off several variations as separate models in the post-World War II years. One of these was the K-38 Target Masterpiece, which began production in 1947. The Target Masterpiece included a number of new and/or special features, including a six-inch barrel with a narrow rib to provide a level sight plane, a Patridge front sight, a micrometer click rear sight, S&W's .375” short-throw hammer, a trigger adjustment for overtravel, and improved grips. Noting the accuracy of the Target Masterpiece, a number of police departments and the Federal Bureau of Investigation soon requested the same revolver with a four-inch barrel and a Baughman Quick Draw front sight. The result was the K-38 Combat Masterpiece. The major distinction between the K-38 Target Masterpiece and the K-38 Combat Masterpiece is the barrel length and the front sight.

In 1957, the K-38 Combat Masterpiece was renamed the Model 15 when all Smith & Wesson revolvers were given numerical model numbers. (The Military & Police and the Target Masterpiece were renamed the Model 10 and Model 14 respectively.) The model number is stamped on the frame behind the cylinder yoke, so it is visible (only) when the cylinder is open. A number of production and engineering changes have been made throughout the years, some of which are noted by a dash number suffixed to the Model number (15-1, -2, -3).

Over the years, the Model 15 has been produced with several barrel lengths, with 4-inch (standard) and 2-inch (1964–1988) being the most common. In 1972, S&W produced a stainless steel version of the Model 15 which it termed the Model 67. In 1997 the hammer and internal lockworks were modified from an on-the-hammer firing pin / internal hammer block to a floating firing pin / metal injection molding flat hammer, and kept the hammer block that, unlike a transfer bar safety design, moves up with the trigger pull. The hammer hits a transfer bar, transferring the strike to the firing pin, while the block in a hammer block system moves down with the trigger pull, unblocking the hammer from the firing pin, allowing the hammer to strike the firing pin. These two safety systems work oppositely, but achieve the same goal of only allowing the gun to fire when the trigger is pulled all the way.

Production of the Model 15 was discontinued in 1999 when Smith & Wesson was purchased and reorganized, although a couple limited run "Heritage Series" models were released in 2001 and 2002. In 2011 Smith & Wesson reintroduced the Model 15 (15-10) under their Classics Revolvers line, newly machined, with a shrouded redesigned barrel, and a built-in trigger lock (located just above the cylinder release thumbpiece on the left side). This was discontinued in 2013.

== Specifications ==
- Caliber: .38 S&W Special
- Capacity: 6
- Barrel: 4” (standard configuration)
- Length overall: 9 1/8” With 4” barrel
- Weight loaded: 34 oz. With 4” barrel
- Sights: Front – 1/8” Baughman Quick Draw on plain ramp. Rear: S&W Micrometer Click Sight, adjustable for windage and elevation.
- Frame: square butt with grooved tangs
- Stocks: checked walnut service with S&W monograms
- Finish: S&W (CHROME) with sandblasting and serrations around sighting area to break up light reflections
- Trigger: S&W grooving with adjustable trigger stop
- Ammunition: .38 S&W Special, .38 S&W Special +P

== Engineering and production changes timeline ==
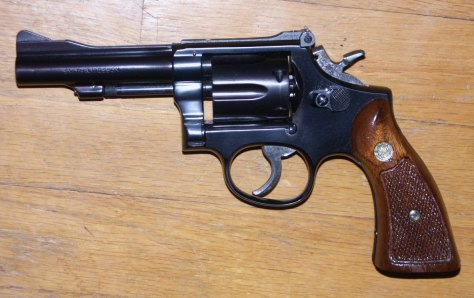
An S&W Model 15 with walnut grip

As the K-38 Combat Masterpiece Revolver Model 15 evolved the following engineering and production changes were made:

- 1949, K-38 Combat Masterpiece introduced
- 1955, Delete upper sideplate screw
- 15, 1957 K-38 Combat Masterpiece continued as the Model 15; stamping of model number
- 15–1, 1959 Change extractor rod, right hand to left hand thread
- 15–2, 1961 Delete trigger guard screw, change cylinder stop
- 15–2, 1964 Introduce 2” heavy barrel
- 15–3, 1967 Relocation of rear sight leaf screw
- 15–3, 1968 Delete diamond grips
- 15–4, 1977 Change to put gas ring from yoke to cylinder; pinned barrel eliminated
- 15–5, 1982
- 15–5, 1986 Introduction of 6” and 8-3/8” barrel
- 15–6, 1988 New yoke retention system/ radius stud package/hammer nose bushing
- 15–6, 1988 Discontinue 8-3/8” and 2” barrel
- 15–6, 1992 Discontinue 6” barrel, blue finish only
- 15–7, 1994 Synthetic grips introduced, drill and tap frame, change rear seat leaf, change extractor
- 15–7, 1995 Delete square butt
- 15–7, 1996 Begin shipments in blue plastic case
- 15–7, 1997 4” barrel only; change to MIM thumbpiece; shipped with master trigger locks; change to MIM trigger
- 15–8, 1997 Changes in frame design: cylinder stop stud eliminated; eliminate serrated tangs; change to MIM hammer with floating firing pin and change internal lockworks
- 15–8, 1999 Model 15 discontinued in November
- 15–8, 2001 Limited run Lew Horton Heritage Series from the S&W Performance Center.
- 15–9, 2002 Limited run Lew Horton Heritage Series McGivern Models from the S&W Performance Center. 3 Models commemorating Ed McGivern's world speed records in 1934 with a revolver. All models have a Patridge front sight with Gold Bead, round butt frame with Altamount Fancy checkered service grips of that era, 6” barrel, Ed McGivern commemorative plate mounted on right side of frame, Heritage Series box.
- 15–10, 2011 Reintroduced in Classics Revolvers line, re-tooled, shrouded redesigned barrel, internal trigger lock. Discontinued in 2013.

== Military and police use ==
As the "K-38 Combat Masterpiece", this revolver was first purchased in 1956 for the Strategic Air Command Elite Guard of the United States Air Force. From 1960 to 1969 the Air Force bought large numbers of Model 15–1, 15–2, and 15-3 revolvers with a 4" barrel. The only distinctive markings are "U.S.A.F" on the left side of the frame. Originally all were blued, though some were reparkerized while in Air Force service. The Model 15 was the standard issue sidearm of the United States Air Force Security Forces from 1962 to 1992. It was issued to security personnel in other branches of the U.S. armed forces, including the Naval Security Forces.

The Air Force issued two types of .38 Special duty ammunition for the Model 15, originally the M41 .38 Special Ball (full metal jacket) cartridge, or the later-developed Caliber .38 Special, Ball, PGU-12/B High Velocity cartridge. The M41 was a low pressure cartridge rated at 13,000 psi (90 MPa), originally designed for 158 grain (10.2g) ball ammunition, but loaded with a 130 grain (8.4g) FMJ bullet. The PGU-12/B, issued only by the U.S. Air Force, had a greatly increased maximum allowable pressure rating of 20,000 psi (138 MPa), which was sufficient to propel the 130 grain (8.4g) FMJ bullet at 1,125 ft/s (343 m/s) from a 6-inch (150 mm) test barrel, and 950–1,000 ft/s (290–300 m/s) from a 4-inch (100 mm) revolver barrel.

The S&W Model 15 revolvers were replaced by the Beretta M9 pistol in 9×19mm caliber beginning in 1985, with complete turnover by the early 1990s. S&W Model 15 revolvers reportedly remained in service in the United States Department of Defense for specific training purposes until summer 2022, when they were retired in favor of the SIG Sauer M17.

In addition to military use, the Model 15 was issued by many police departments across the United States as well as various federal law enforcement agencies.

The LAPD's Model 15 revolvers (and department issued Model 36 5-shot, 2-inch barrelled snub nose Smith & Wesson revolvers for detectives, plainclothes, undercover and other officers' off duty carry) were modified to be fired double-action only. This was accomplished by the department armorer who ground the full cock notch from the hammers. Officers were then trained to shoot combat style without ever cocking the weapons. This change was likely the result of unintended injuries and/or property damage, and of litigation against the LAPD after officers had cocked their weapons only to have them discharge inadvertently, possibly as a result of physical attacks or having been startled in the course of searching for suspects. In lawsuits, the principle of res ipsa loquitur was easily affirmed because "an inadvertent weapon discharge is a negligent discharge".

Overland Park Police Department used the revolver before going to semi-automatic Beretta 92 pistols.

The Florida Department of Corrections used the Model 15 until it was replaced by the Smith & Wesson M&P.

== Users ==
- Indonesia US Military Assistance Program 316 in 1974 with 102mm barrel and 2,000 in 1972 with 51mm barrel.
- United States
  - United States Air Force Ground Personnel
  - United States Secret Service Uniformed Division
  - Arizona Department of Public Safety
  - Los Angeles Police Department
  - Los Angeles County Sheriff's Department
  - Missouri State Police
  - Oklahoma State Police Used Smith & Wesson Model 15 until 1971 when replaced by Officer's choice of .357, .44, or .41 Magnum revolvers.
  - Tennessee Highway Patrol 4 inch Barrel

== See also ==
- Smith & Wesson Model 10 (cornerstone of the S&W .38 Special line of revolvers)
- Smith & Wesson Model 14 (6" barrel predecessor to the Model 15)
- Smith & Wesson Model 18 (.22 Long Rifle version of the Model 15)
- Smith & Wesson Model 19 (.357 Magnum version of the Model 15)
