= 610th Security Forces Squadron =

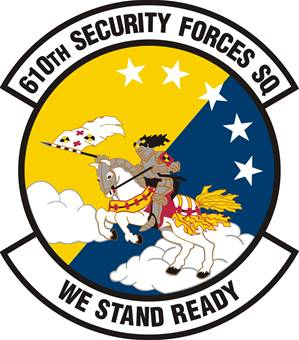
- Emblem of the 610th Security Forces Squadron
- Active: As AFRES Ground Combat Readiness Center (1990–1995); As 610 SFS (1995-2015)
- Branch: United States Air Force
- Type: Military police
- Role: Air base defense
- Motto(s): Defensor Fortis

Commanders
- Final Commander: Lt. Col. Goodenough
- Final Senior Elisted Leader: CMSgt Ferguson

Insignia
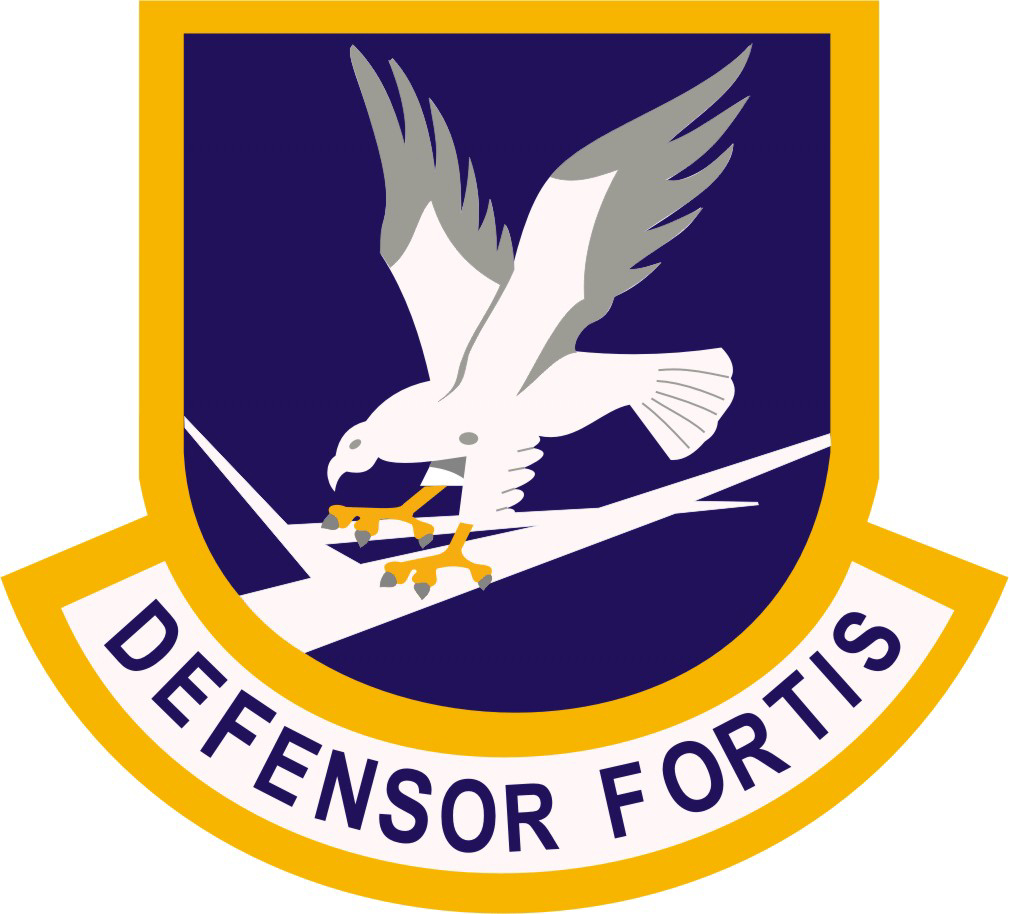
- Beret Flash

- Occupation Badge

The 610th Security Forces Squadron (610 SFS) was a United States Air Force Reserve unit located at the Naval Air Station JRB Fort Worth. The unit was unique as it did not serve a law enforcement purpose on the base, but instead focuses on combat readiness. The unit was originally designated AFRES Ground Combat Readiness Center and was re-designated 610 SFS in November 1995. The 610th SFS officially shut its doors on 1 October 2015, due to the federal budget for FY 2016. Most of the traditional reservists merged with the 301st Security Forces Squadron, which is located on the same installation.

== Mission ==
To organize, train, and equip to meet worldwide contingency and Air Expeditionary Force requirements. Also, to develop, manage, and execute ground combat skills and other readiness related training activities directed by HQ Air Force Reserve Command.

== Training Courses ==
There were nine training courses operated by the 610 SFS, including the Patriot Defender course located at Fort Wolters, Mineral Wells, Texas.

== Deployment History ==
The 610 SFS had deployed five times to Afghanistan, three times to Iraq, twice to Kuwait, Saudi Arabia, and Puerto Rico, as well as once to eleven other sites. In addition, it had conducted joint training with No. 2620 Squadron Royal Auxiliary Air Force Regiment, a field squadron at RAF Marham, United Kingdom.
