= 732nd Expeditionary Security Forces Squadron =

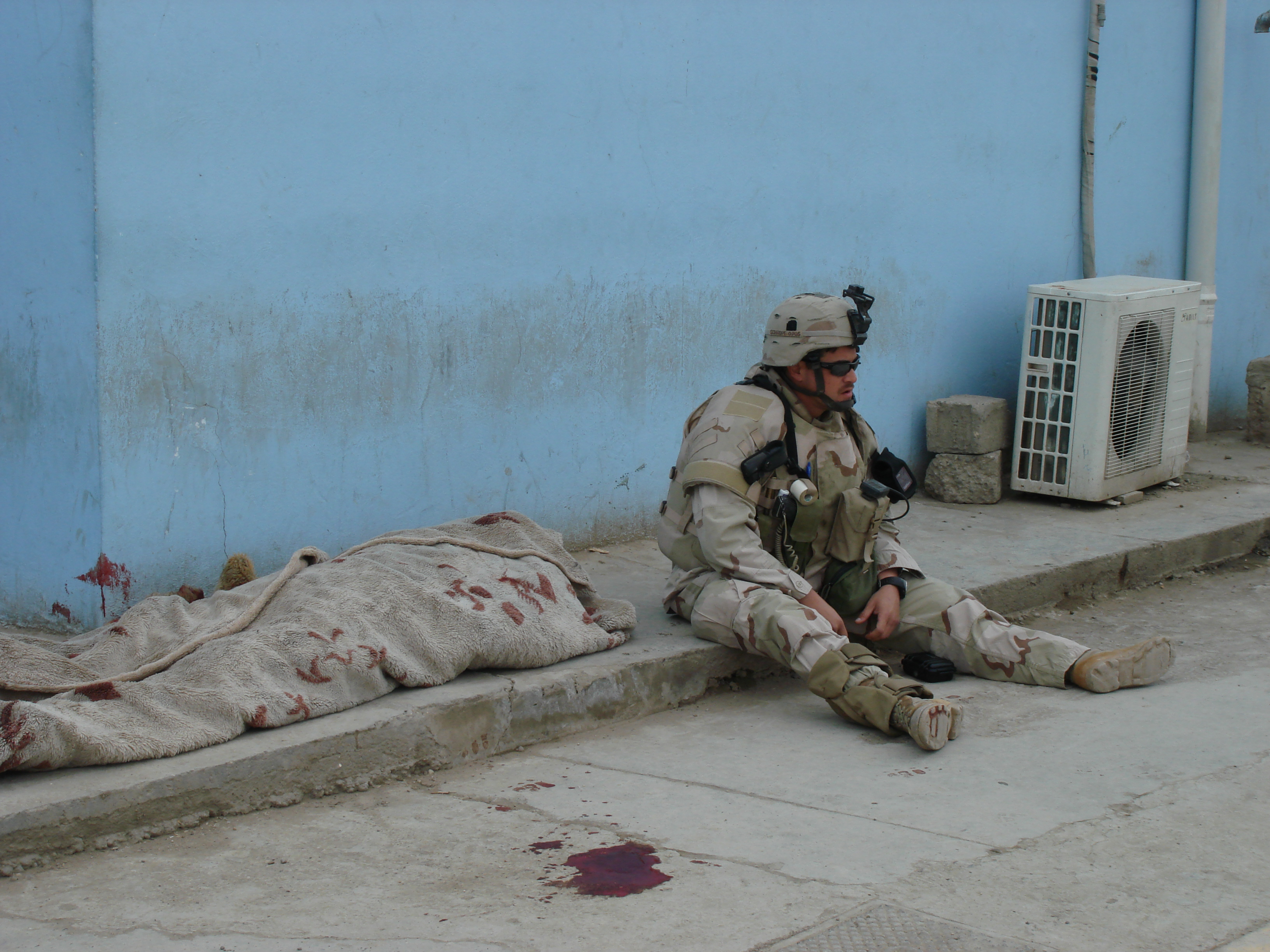
Capt. Robert Schrope at the Hayy Al-A'amel Police Station 2006 with a covered body next to him

732 ESFS/Detachment 3 and 732 ESFS/Detachment 2 was a United States Air Force Security Forces unit sent to support Police Transition Teams in Baghdad, Iraq from 2005 until 31 July 2010. It was a "Request for Forces" (RFF) #619 or "In Lieu Of" agreement between the United States Air Force and United States Army. Rff 619 earned multiple unit awards and its members received individual awards such as the Army Combat Action Badge, Air Force Combat Action Medal, Purple Heart, and the Bronze Star. Det 3 was the most highly decorated and regarded Air Force unit that participated in OIF.

== Organization ==
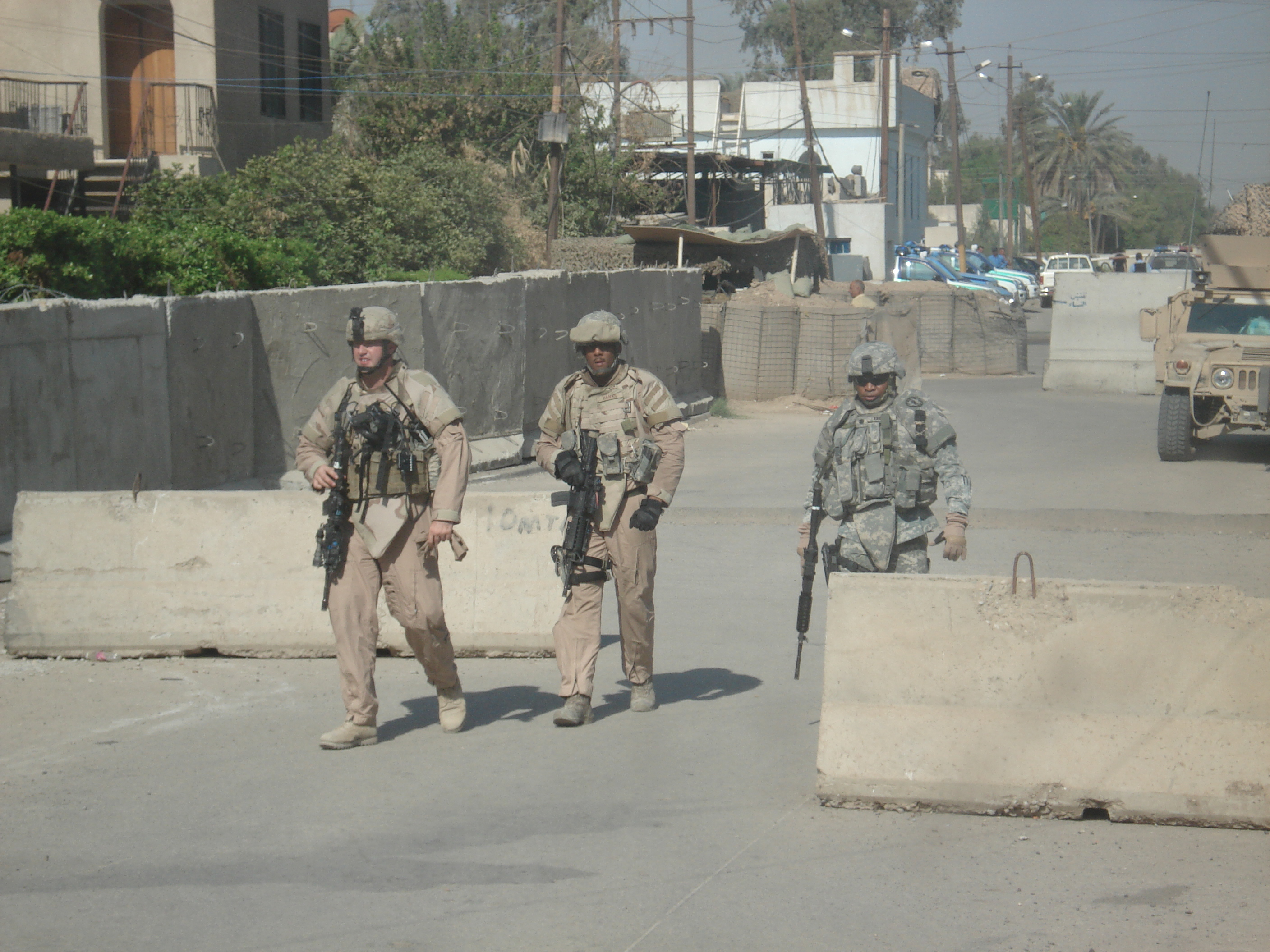
Det-3 performing PSD duties in the Yarmouk neighborhood of Karkh district 2007.

RFF 619. While the detachments fell under the naming convention of the 732 ESFS located at Balad AB, Iraq, neither Det fell under them operationally. Det-3 was a subordinate unit of the 1-1 Cavalry and the 336 MP Battalion, and later served under the 1 ABCT, 4th Infantry Division. In January 2009, Detachment 2 was formed and deployed to join the PTT efforts in Iraq. They were based initially at FOB Mahmudiyah in the middle of the "Triangle of Death”. Det 6 was a Police Transition Team located at COB Speicher attached to the 97 MP Company part of the 25th ID, 89th Brigade. Detachment 6 was co-located with the 128th MP Company. The 732 ESFS Det 6 was also stationed at the MPSA (Mosul Public Safety Academy) Mosul Iraq from Dec 2005 to June 2006. and conducted In Lieu of missions for the U.S. Army.

== Mission ==
Performs combat patrols at Iraqi Police stations. Trains, mentors and coaches the Iraqi Police in arguably Baghdad's worst districts to include [Arab Jabour] [Doura] [Abu Tshir] Al Rashid, Karadah, (Mahmudiyah) and (Lutifyah). Its main objective is to restore faith and legitimacy to the Iraqi Police. Det-3/Det-2 has also performed Protective Services Detail for high-ranking Army, Air Force, and civilian officials into such cities as Ramadi and Fallujah.

== History ==
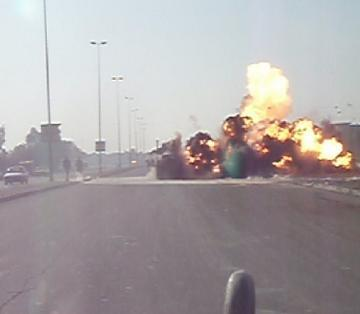
A roadside bomb strikes Wildcard 3-1 in the Al Rashid district January 2007

When deployed in June 2006, RFF 619 was renamed 732nd Expeditionary Security Forces Squadron's Detachment 7. A majority of the members and the core leadership originated from the 824th Security Forces Squadron, Moody AFB, Georgia. Other airmen from 204th Security Forces Squadron El Paso, Texas and the 23rd Security Forces Squadron, Moody AFB augmented the 824th SFS. In Nov 2006, Security Forces volunteers from over 65 different bases relieved the 824th Security Forces Squadron. Shortly thereafter, the Air Force redesignated Det-7 as Det-3. This unit (call sign: Wildcards) would become the very first year-long PTT tour conducted by Security Forces. Det-3 would be assigned to the 92nd MP Battalion deployed to Camp Liberty in Baghdad. In September 2007, a multimillion-dollar compound was constructed on Sather Air Base. It would be named "Camp Defender" in honor of fallen members A1C Lee Bernard Chavis and SSgt John T. Self. The area contains living quarters, a Base defense operations center, Armory, and a motor pool. In early 2008 Det-3 Shadow Company was relocated to Forward Operating Base Falcon, Baghdad Iraq.

Det 2 started in 2009 and relieved Army MP's at FOB Mahmudiyah(St. Michael previously named), which was located south of Det 3/Camp Falcon. This location was a connection of the cities known before/during the Iraq surge as the Triangle of Death, cities included Mahmudiyah, Latifya, Yusufiya. After 8 months Det 2 completed their mission in the triangle and in August 2009 was reassigned to Camp Stryker(Victory Base Complex) and conduct the same mission into the Abu Ghraib and southern Baghdad.

Det 3 ran missions from several camps, forward operating bases, and joint security stations around Baghdad.

The Det 3 Praetorians were relocated and inactivated on 3 July 2010 at Camp Taji. Having achieved their mission, training Iraqi police, helping transition them toward law enforcement primacy over the Iraqi Army. 732 ESFS, Det 2 was officially "Off Mission" and relieved of duty on 26 July 2010 by the Army's 94th MP Company at Camp Stryker, Iraq.

== W.I.A and K.I.A ==
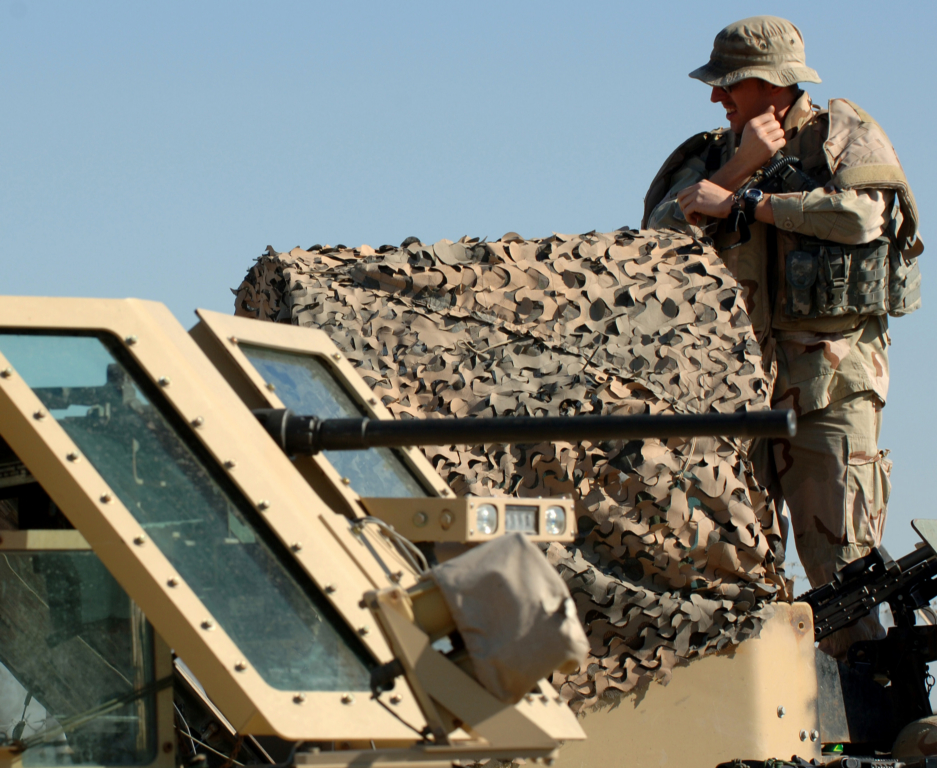
SSgt John Self was killed 14 May 2007

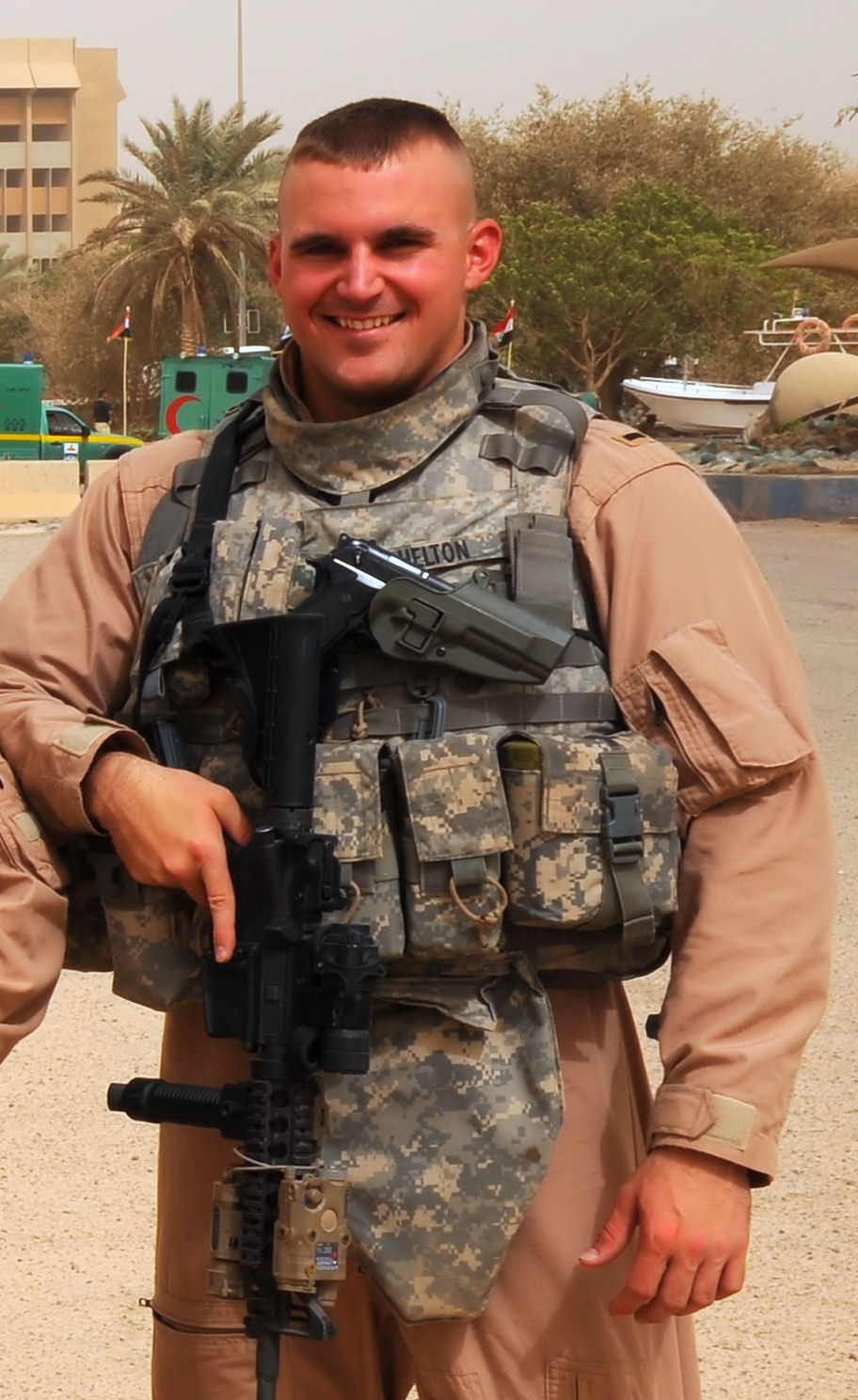
1st Lt Joseph Helton was killed in September 2009

On 22 September 2006 Airman 1st Class Jeremy Birchfield an 824th Security Forces Squadron turret gunner was hit by a sniper during patrol operations. He was presented with the Purple Heart at Camp Victory, Iraq 24 Sept. 2006.

On 14 October 2006, A1C Lee Bernard Chavis was killed by small arms fire in the Karadah District of Baghdad. A1C Chavis was mortally wounded while securing the site of a suspected improvised explosive device. A1C Chavis was awarded the Bronze Star and Purple Heart posthumously.

On 15 April 2007, SSgt Scott Lilley was injured when the team he was with was attacked by insurgents and his vehicle hit by an Improvised Explosive Device (IED).

On 25 April 2008, Wildcard 2-1, Charlie vehicle, was struck by an IED while traveling down route Ash where local national interpreter Ahmed was critically wounded and A1C Jonathan Higgins, and Tsgt Thaddeus Ledet sustained minor injuries, and was later diagnosed with a Traumatic Brain Injury. A1C Higgins Tsgt Thaddeus Ledet received the Global War On Terrorism Expeditionary Medal, Air Force Combat Action Badge, Bronze Star and Purple Heart in February 2009.

On 14 May 2007, SSgt John T. Self was killed and three airmen were wounded. SrA Joshua Brooksand SrA Melanie Manley sustained critical injuries, and SSgt Brian Breen sustained minor injuries when an IED hit the Humvee they were traveling in the Al Rashid district of Baghdad. The Squad was traveling down route Vernon and had just passed route Steelers en route back to the VBC complex when their Humvee was struck by an IED.

On 23 June 2007, A1C Jason D. Nathan was killed when an IED was detonated near his vehicle in Tikrit.

On 3 July 2007, Wildcard 1–3; SSgt Daniel Peña, SrA Lawrence Taylor and SrA Mark Brown, were injured when their vehicle was hit by an IED. The squad was traveling on Route Vernon and was en route to Al Bayaa, Baghdad Police Station in the Al Rashid district.

On 3 April 2008, SSgt Travis Griffin was killed by an IED that detonated near his vehicle while on patrol. SrA Tony Maffei, SrA Joseph Ronchetto, and Spc. Curtis Worthy were also injured in the blast.

On 8 September 2009, 1st Lt Joseph D. Helton was killed when an IED hit the Humvee he was traveling in the Al Rashid district of Baghdad. He was the first KIA for Det 2 after previously serving 9 months as a Flight Commander for Det 3. Also WIA were SrA Victor Wise and SrA Jon Gally.

On 15 September 2009, SrA Philip Newlyn, A1C Eddy Kelley and SSgt Justin Stubbs were injured after an IED hit their Humvee while traveling in the Al Rashid district of Baghdad.

== Unit names ==
- 2005-2006 "Sheriff of Baghdad" Det 2/3
- 2006 "Ghostwalkers" Det 3
- 2006–2007 "Wildcards" Det 3
- 2007–2008 "Shadows" Det 3
- 2008–2009 "Renegades" Det 3
- 2009-2010 “Rough Riders” Det 2
- 2009-2010 “Praetorians" Det 3

== In Media ==
In August 2006, a Det-3 M1114 turret shield was found utilizing what now has become the infamous slogan "Iraqi Photo's". The picture has made its way through email and various humor sites.

The Valdosta, Georgia based band "Killed by the Clue Knife" wrote the song entitled "Doc Schrope and His Long Hair" about an Air Force medic from Det-7.

In Sept 2006 several music videos were released depicting Det-7 in Baghdad. The videos were posted on Myspace and YouTube and are also shown at the 343rd Training Squadron.

In honor of SSgt. Travis Griffin, a workout was established on the popular exercise site Crossfit.

== See also ==
- Operation Together Forward
- Iraq War troop surge of 2007
