= 343rd Training Squadron =

Training unit to prepare airmen for service in US Air Force Security Forces

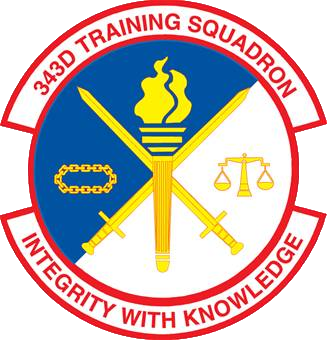
Emblem

The 343rd Training Squadron (343rd TRS), also called the Security Forces Academy is located at Lackland AFB in San Antonio, TX. It was established 30 April 1976 as the 3280th Technical Training Group, and re-designated twice more until 1 April 1994 when it received its current designation.

The majority of the permanent members of this squadron are training instructors. There are, on average, around 1300 students at any given time. The Staff also consists of 15 Military Training Leaders who are responsible for physical and military growth of all students assigned to the 343rd. Detachment One at Camp Bullis is responsible for expeditionary ground combat training.

== Training ==
The Security Forces Academy is a 65 day course of intense physical and mental training designed to ensure that new Defenders are mission ready upon graduation. Defenders are taught the basics of military law enforcement, as well as extensive training in weapons, air base defense, hand-to-hand combatives, infantry tactics, and combat convoy operations. At the end of the course, graduating students receive their blue beret and badge, earning the title "Defender".
