= 229th Engineer Battalion (United States) =

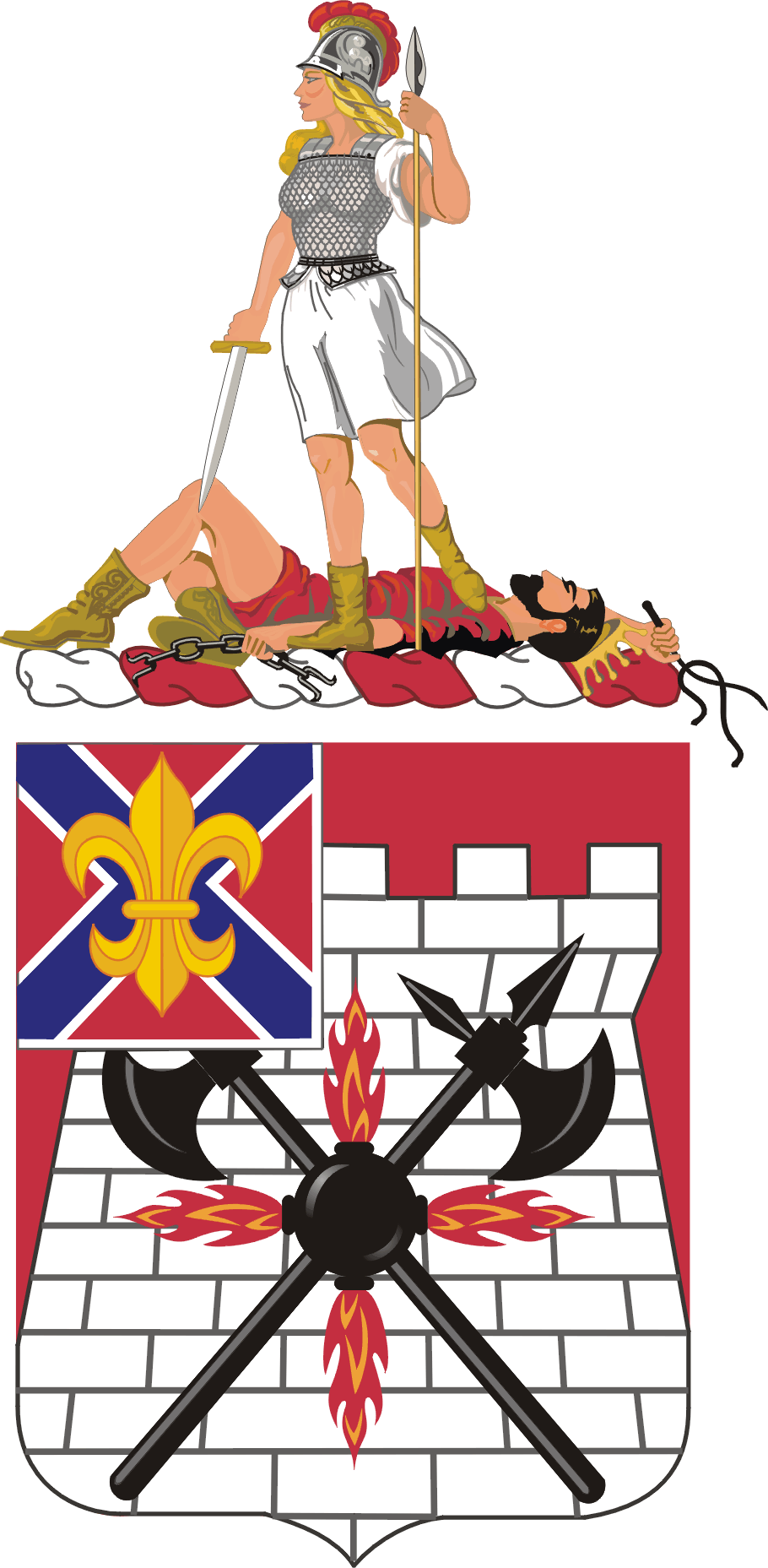
- Coat of Arms
- Active: 1858–2026
- Country: United States
- Branch: United States Army
- Type: Engineer
- Size: Battalion
- Garrison/HQ: Fredericksburg, Virginia, U.S.
- Motto: "Sappers Lead"
- Engagements: World War I; World War II; War on terror

Insignia
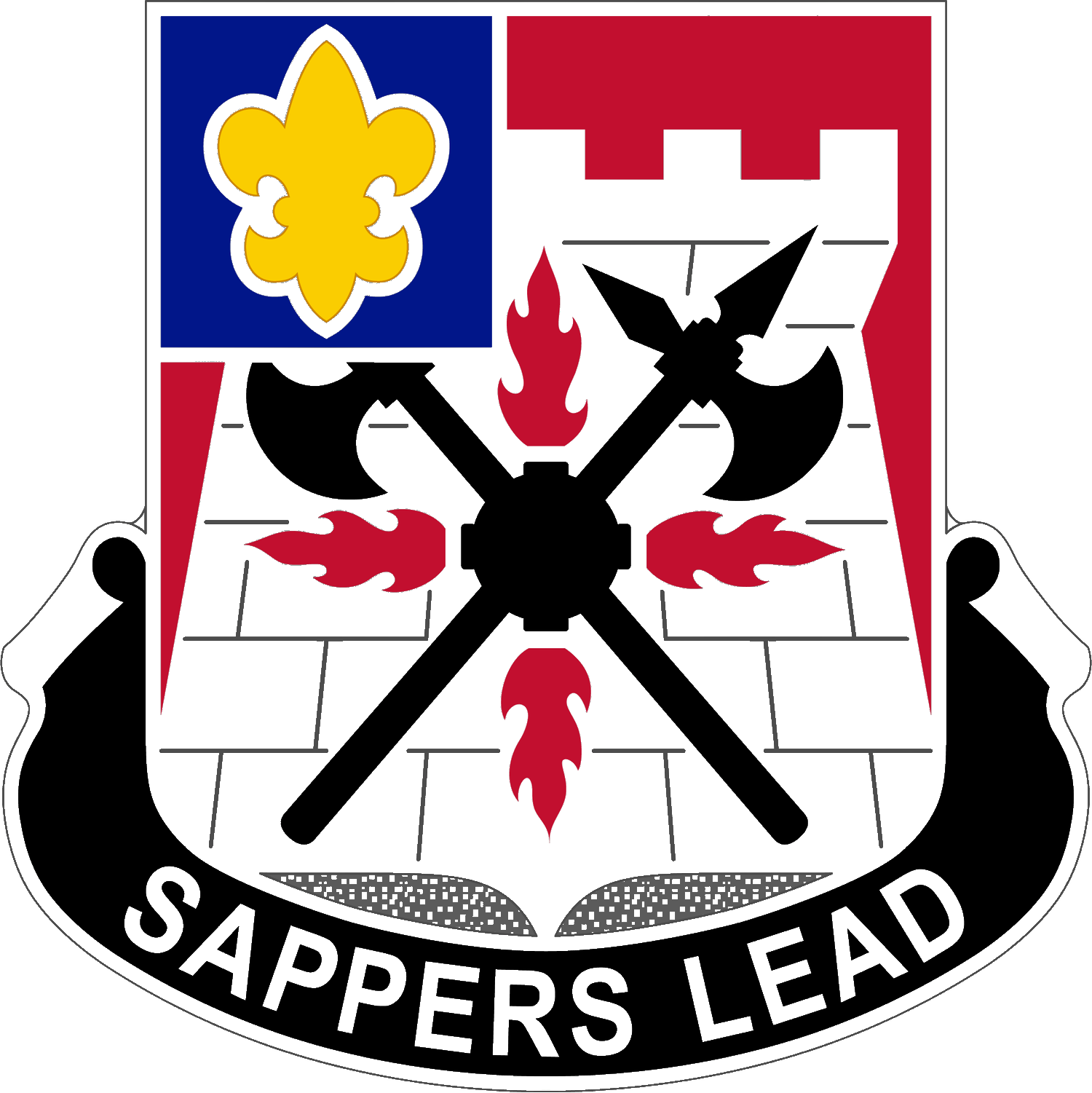
- Distinctive unit insignia

The 229th Brigade Engineer Battalion is an Engineer Battalion in the Virginia Army National Guard, part of the 29th Infantry Division's 116th Infantry Brigade Combat Team. First formed under the designation in 1985, it became the 116th Brigade Special Troops Battalion in 2005. It was renamed the 229th Brigade Engineer Battalion once again in 2016. The battalion was inactivated on 8 August 2026.

== History ==
The Fredericksburg unit traces its lineage and honors to 1858 and its service as a militia unit in the Army of Northern Virginia. In 1985, the 229th Engineer Battalion was formed, and units in the battalion saw multiple overseas deployments to Bosnia, Iraq and Afghanistan. Personnel from the 229th Engineer Battalion were also mobilized to provide security at the Ronald Reagan Washington National Airport outside Washington, D.C. in Crystal City, Virginia, following the September 11 attacks.

The 229th was reorganized in 2005 as the Special Troops Battalion, 116th Brigade Combat Team in an Army-wide reorganization of brigades into Brigade Combat Teams. "Troops Forward" became the unit's motto. The STB consisted of an HHC with platoons of Infantry, Support (Medical, Food Service and Transportation), Chemical, Military Police, Supply, Mechanics, Cavalry, Logistics and Administration. There were three other companies in the Special Troops Battalion (Engineers, Military Intelligence and Signal).

On 15 October 2016, the Special Troops Battalion became the 229th Brigade Engineer Battalion. The battalion's current structure has Company A, a combat engineer company; Company B, a combat engineer company specializing in route clearance; Company C, a signal company; Company D, a military intelligence company; and Company E, a support company providing sustainment support, including transportation, maintenance and food service.

The 189th Engineer Company was reassigned from the 276th Engineer Battalion to the 116th in 2016 and became the core of Company B and the 189th designation was inactivated. The 189th was formerly a bridging unit, but has been reorganized as a combat engineer sapper company.
