= Defense Supply Center, Richmond =

United States military logistics base

Coordinates: 37.418°N 77.451°W

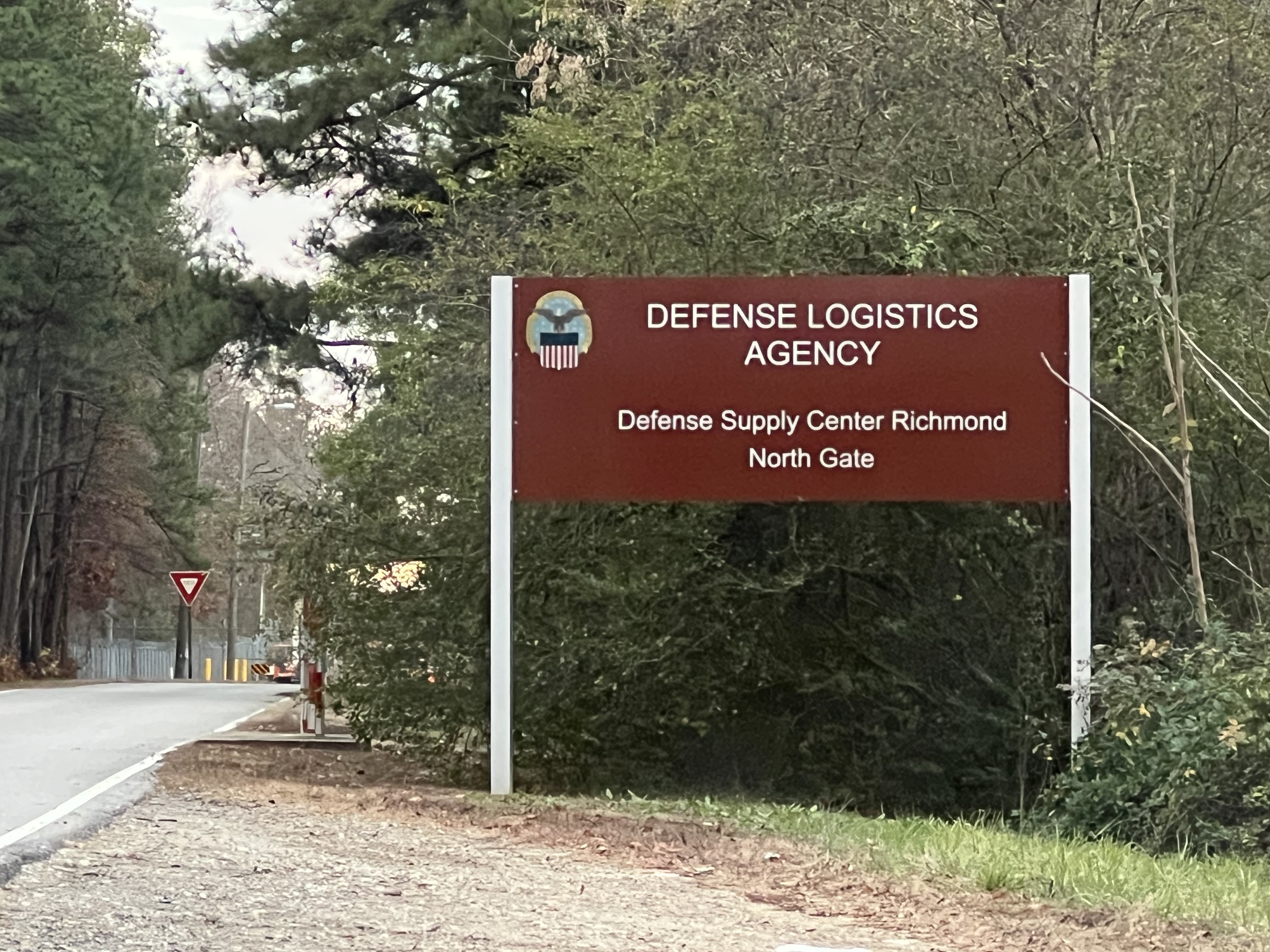
The North Gate of the Defense Supply Center, Richmond

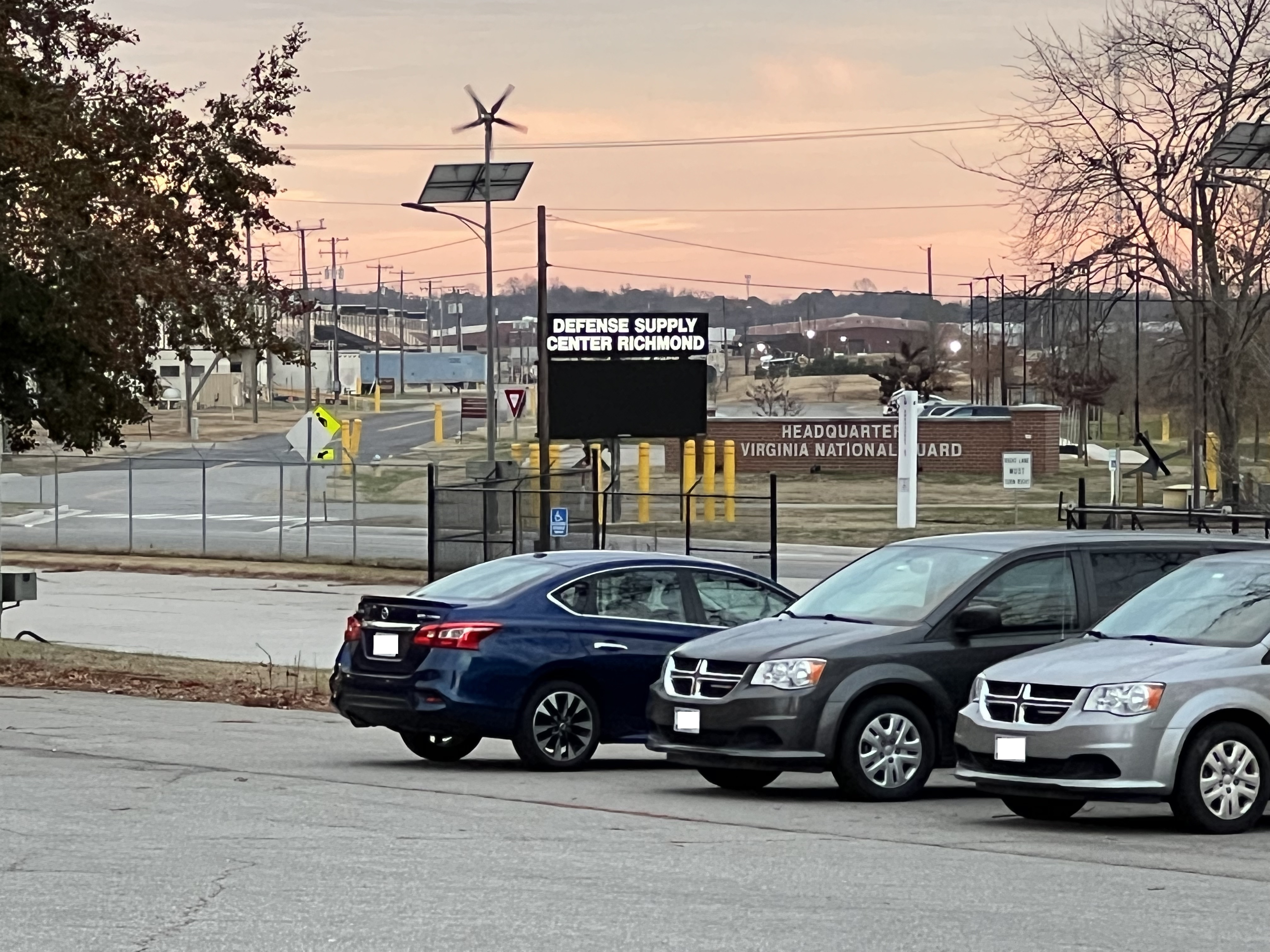
The Defense Supply Center, Richmond

Defense Supply Center, Richmond, or DSCR, serves as the Aviation Demand and Supply Chain manager for the Defense Logistics Agency. It is located on the I-95 corridor in Chesterfield County, Virginia in the Southside area of the Greater Richmond Region. The installation comprises 631 acres (2.55 km^{2}) that was the Bellwood farm in 1887 and was opened in 1942. Originally activated as the Richmond General Depot under the command of Lt. Col. Turner R. Sharp, the site was later renamed the Richmond Armed Service Forces Depot, which became the Richmond Quartermaster Depot.

== History ==
In its first two decades, the mission of the Richmond Quartermaster Depot was one of traditional logistics support to the U.S. Army with emphasis on Quartermaster items. When the Military General Supply Agency was activated in 1962, it absorbed the Defense Supply Agency. This resulted in an expanded mission for the depot, which included supply management of more than 30,000 general supply items for the military services and certain civilian agencies worldwide. The installation name changed to Defense General Supply Center to match its new logistical mission. In 1977 Defense Supply Agency became Defense Logistics Agency. In 1986, depot operations were separated from inventory control point functions and a separate command was established on the site: Defense Distribution Depot Richmond.

DSCR's core mission is to supply products with a direct application to aviation. These items include a mix of military-unique items supporting over 1,300 major weapons systems and other items readily available in the commercial market. They range from critical, safety-of-flight air frame structural components, bearings, and aircraft engine parts, to electric cable and electrical power products; lubricating oils; batteries; industrial gases, bearings; precision instruments; environmental products; metalworking machinery and consumable items. DSCR also operates an industrial plant equipment repair facility in Mechanicsburg, PA.

In July 2010, the DSCR supply chain manager was renamed to the Defence Logistic Agency (DLA) Aviation. The DSCR, which remained the name of the physical location, houses 1,860 workers of the DLA Aviation.

There is a small herd of elk on the backside of the post. When the Army bought the land on which the post is located, the former owners asked the Army to care for these animals, and the post has done so ever since.

In August 2016, the Virginia National Guard began construction of a new headquarters in the northern section of the DSCR, The $30 million project was to be completed in February 2018. The Virginia National Guard already had various active units on DSC including the 429th Brigade Support Battalion, the 116th Infantry Brigade Combat Team, the Guard’s Central Issue Facility and the Combat Support Maintenance Shop and Company B. The new headquarters opened on May 14, 2018.

== Environmental review ==
In the 1960s and early 1970s, DSCR disposed of some of their waste material in a shallow ravine called the Area 50 Landfill. In the 1980s, groundwater contaminated primarily with volatile organic compounds (VOCs) was detected downgradient of the landfill. The DSCR site then was proposed for inclusion on the U.S. EPA's Exiting Agency for Toxic Substances and Disease Registry (ATSDR) Website National Priorities List (NPL) in 1984 by EPA for contaminated groundwater and source areas. On July 22, 1987, the Center was formally placed on the National Priority List. In 1993, ATSDR completed a Public Health Assessment that provided recommendations for dealing with the toxic runoff. In 2001, Virginia Department of Environmental Quality had ATSDR follow up on these recommendations, and the May 2001 report concluded that "ATSDR concludes that the recommendations were substantially met with the appropriate public health actions."

== Awards ==
In July 2025, the DSCR was awarded the 2025 Secretary of Defense Environmental Award for Cultural Resources Management.
