= DSCR =

DSCR may refer to:

- Daylesford Spa Country Railway, a heritage railway in Victoria, Australia
- Debt service coverage ratio
- Defense Supply Center, Richmond
