= 116th Mobile Brigade Combat Team =

- Shoulder sleeve insignia of the 29th Infantry Division (higher headquarters)
- Active: 1975–present
- Country: United States
- Branch: United States Army
- Role: Infantry
- Part of: 29th Infantry Division
- Brigade Headquarters: Staunton, Virginia
- Nicknames: Normandy Brigade; previously the Stonewall Brigade
- Motto: Ever Forward
- Colors: Blue and Gray
- Engagements: American Civil War; World War I World War II; Operation Joint Forge; Operation Enduring Freedom; Operation Iraqi Freedom; Operation New Dawn

Commanders
- Current commander: COL Brian Gallavan

Insignia
- Former shoulder sleeve insignia of the brigade

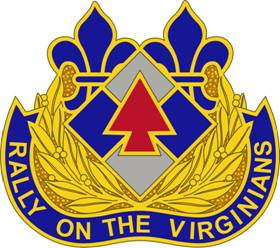
- Distinctive Unit Insignia (cancelled 1 April 2007)

The 116th Mobile Brigade Combat Team is a mobile brigade combat team currently assigned to the Virginia Army National Guard, formerly known as the 1st Brigade, 29th Infantry Division; it is the largest command of the Virginia Army National Guard with an authorized strength of 3,400. The brigade is headquartered in Staunton, Virginia, at the Thomas Howie Memorial Armory, and is nicknamed the Stonewall Brigade in honor of its association with the 116th Infantry Regiment, tracing its lineage back to elements of an American Civil War Confederate brigade of the same name led by General Stonewall Jackson.

== History ==
2nd Brigade, 29th Infantry Division was formed on 22 March 1963 as part of the United States Army Reorganization Objective Army Division (ROAD) reorganization, which assigned three brigades to each division, replacing the previous Pentomic system. The Headquarters and Headquarters Company (HHC) of the brigade was redesignated from Staunton-based Company D, 2d Battle Group, 116th Infantry, which had previously served as the headquarters company of the 116th Infantry Regiment between 1956 and 1959, after which it was consolidated with the regiment's Tank Company during the Pentomic reorganization. The 29th Division was eliminated on 1 February 1968, and the 2nd Brigade became the 116th Brigade, 28th Infantry Division.

The brigade headquarters was consolidated with Detachment 3, 28th Adjutant General Company on 1 April 1975 when the brigade became the 116th Infantry Brigade, a nondivisional unit supervised by the Virginia Department of Military Affairs. Its units included the 1st, 2nd, and 3rd Battalions of the 116th Infantry, the 1st Battalion, 246th Field Artillery, Troop C, 183rd Cavalry, the 76th Aviation Company, the 237th Engineer Company, and the 684th Heavy Equipment Maintenance Company. The 29th was reformed in 1985 and the brigade was accordingly redesignated as the 1st Brigade, 29th Infantry Division on 1 May 1986. During the army's reorganization into brigade combat teams in 2005, 1st Brigade, 29th Division again became the 116th Brigade, this time as an infantry brigade combat team, on 1 September.

On 1 November 2002, the 2nd Battalion, 116th Infantry Regiment was mobilized for deployment to Guantanamo Bay, Cuba to take part in Operation Enduring Freedom. This marked the first mobilization of a battalion of the 29th Infantry Division since World War II. The unit provided security of the base and Camp Delta, the detainee camp.

On 1 March 2004, the 3rd Battalion, 116th Infantry Regiment was mobilized for deployment to Afghanistan to take part in Operation Enduring Freedom. Members of the battalion reported to armories around Virginia and began arriving at Bagram Air Field in Afghanistan on 15 July 2004. They were quickly engaged in operations. The battalion conducted combat operations in Ghazni and SECFOR operations at Bagram Airfield. Numerous slice elements were placed under the operational control of the battalion. The newly formed task force assumed the name of the beaches the regiment stormed more than 60 years prior – Normandy. During the deployment two 116th Infantry soldiers were killed by a roadside bomb, the first Virginia National Guard soldiers to die in combat since World War II. The battalion returned to the United States in July 2005.

In August 2006, the 1st Battalion mobilized in support of KFOR as part of the 29th Infantry Division to provide stability operations in the Serbian province of Kosovo with NATO. They become known as Task Force Red Dragon for the duration of their deployment.

In 2007, the Brigade Special Troops Battalion, 116th BCT of the Virginia Army National Guard replaced the 229th Engineer Battalion.

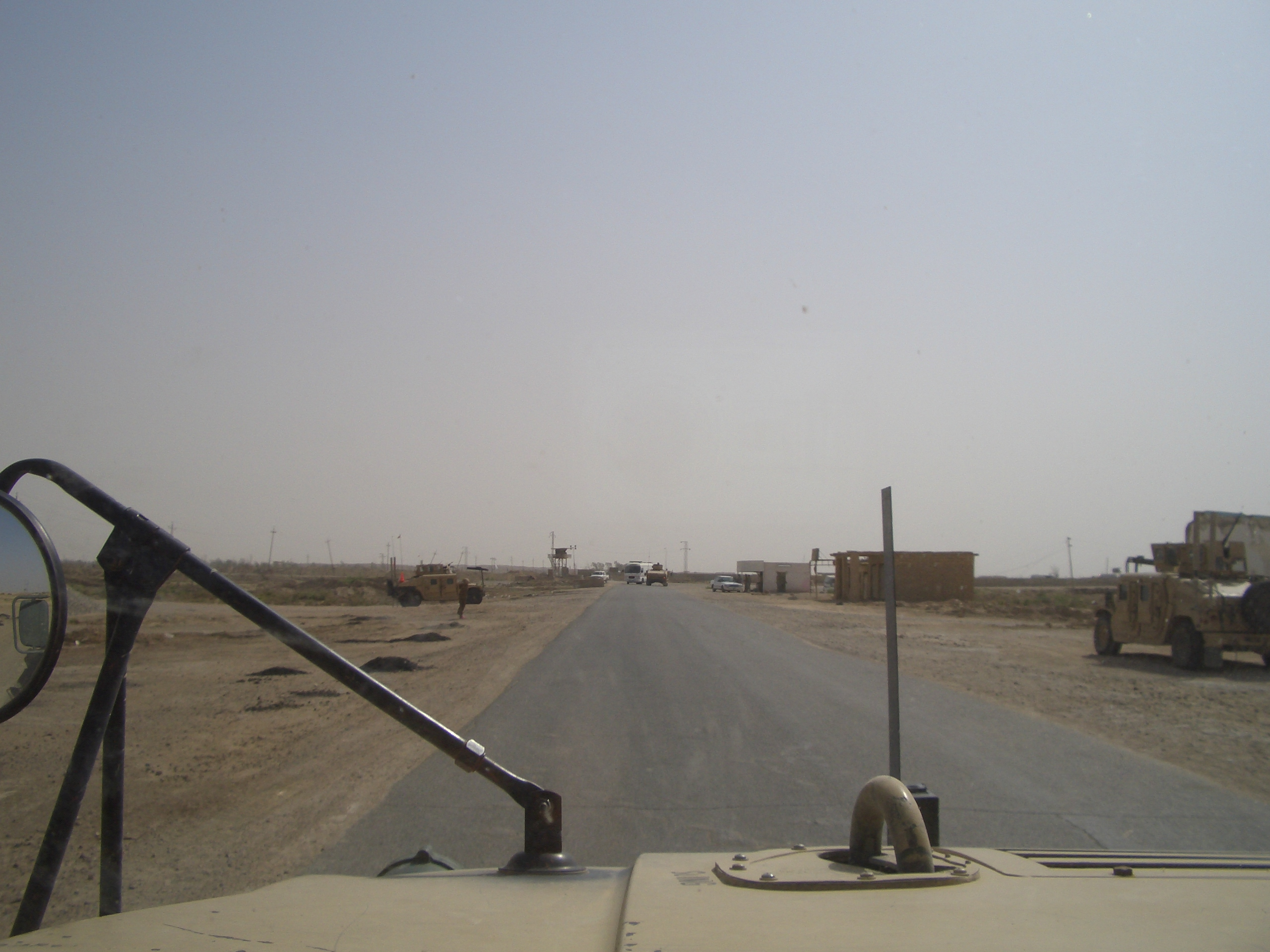
Road to MSR rout Tampa

In May 2007, the Brigade Headquarters Company mobilized in support of Operation Iraqi Freedom. Headquarters Company was stationed on the International Zone and did not suffer any casualties. A company 116th BSTB was stationed in Camp Cedar II, near the city of An Nāşirīyah, Iraq. Among many tasks, the combat engineer unit conducted route clearance throughout MSR route Tampa to clear convoys for safe travel. In February 2008, the unit demobilized at Fort Dix, NJ and returned to Fredericksburg, VA

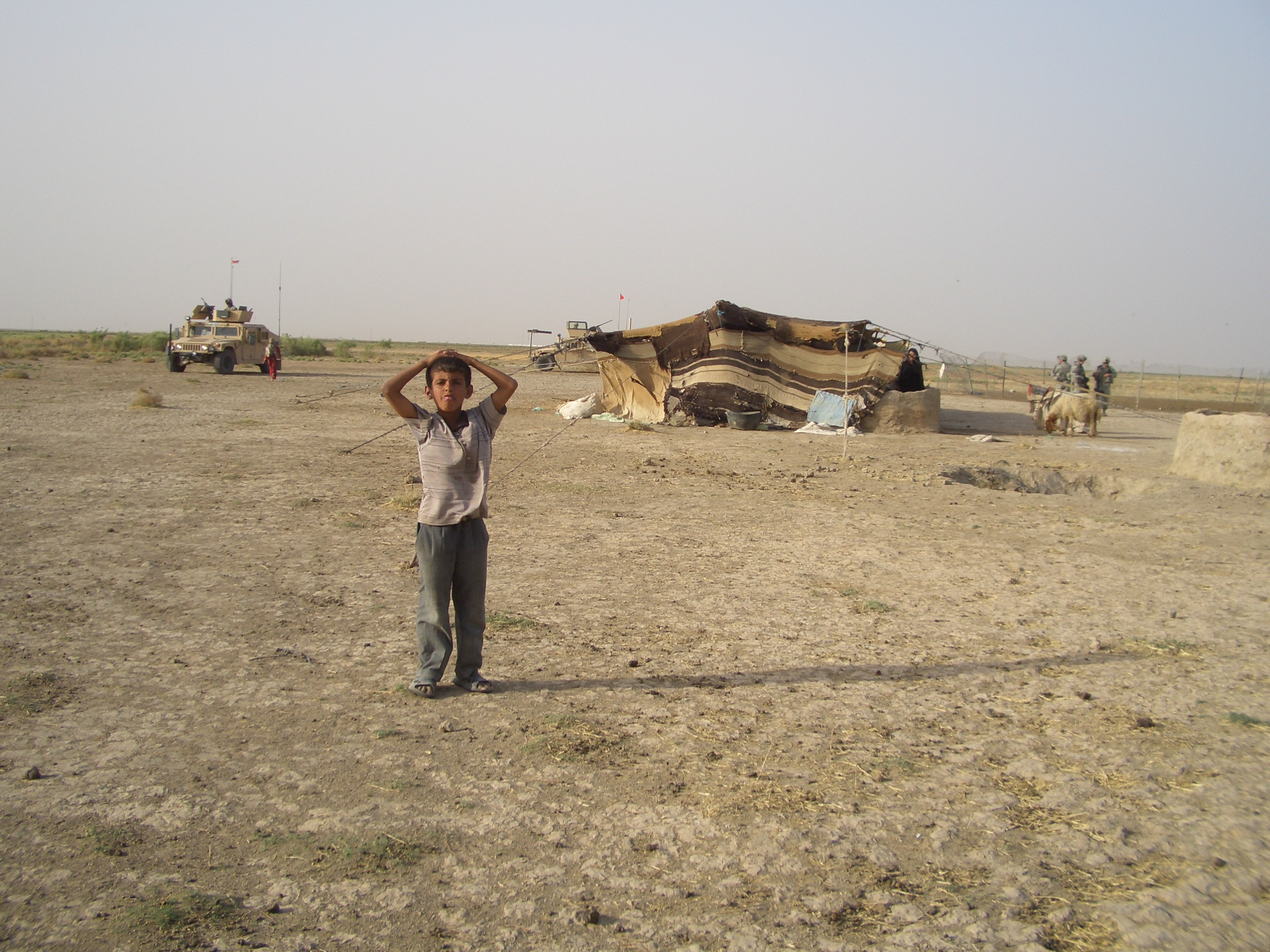
Bedouin family home

In June 2007, the 2d Squadron, 183rd Cavalry Regiment commanded by LTC Walt Mercer; the 3d Battalion, 116th Infantry Regiment commanded by LTC John M. Epperly; and Company F, 429th Brigade Support Battalion were deployed to Iraq and Kuwait. Companies A, B, and C of the 3d Battalion, 116th Infantry Regiment successfully conducted convoy security patrols throughout Iraq. HHC & Co D, 3–116th, 2–183rd CAV, and F/429th conducted security force missions in Kuwait and Southern Iraq for strategically vital assets; to include 2-183rd CAV Troops A and C, with HQ and Colorado Guard components completing several extended roadside and personal security, surveillance and mercy missions, and numerous combat patrols throughout Kuwait and Southern Iraq provinces and along oil pipelines outside Basrah. The Purple Heart was awarded during the deployment for taking shrapnel from sniper fire, and the Iraq Campaign Medal was issued for those members serving in the Iraq theater of operations.

In January 2010, the first battalion mobilized with the Louisiana National Guard's 256th IBCT to Iraq and conducted convoy security missions in southern Iraq. Known at TF Overlord, a tribute the unit's D-Day heritage, the unit includes the Headquarters Company from Lynchburg, VA; Company A from Bedford, VA; Company B from Lexington, VA; Company C from Christiansburg, VA; and Company D from Pulaski, VA. The battalion was commanded by LTC E. Scott Smith of Lynchburg, VA. The unit returned with no losses in September 2010.

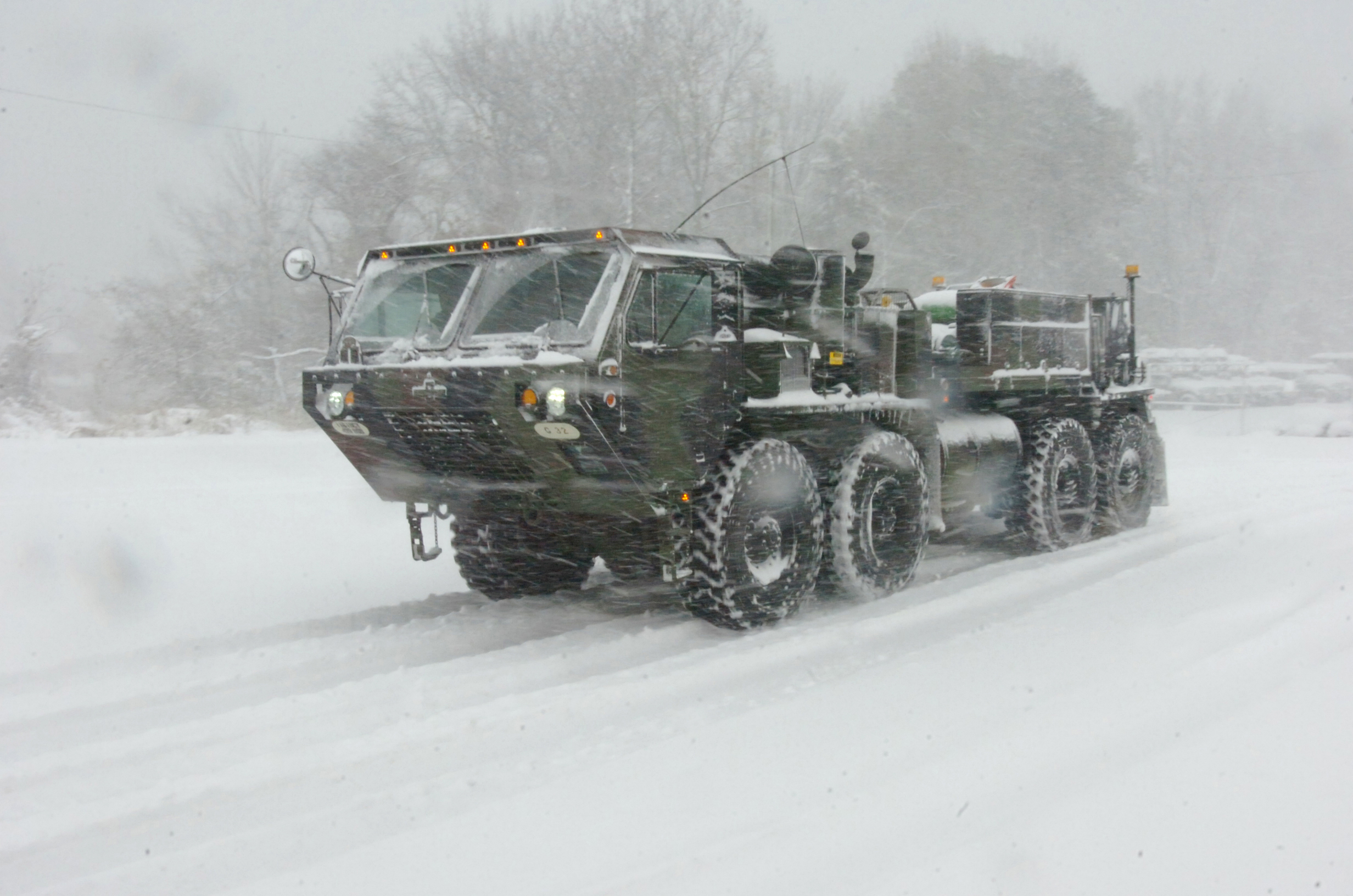
The 116th Brigade Combat Team was called to state active duty in Norfolk, Virginia, in response to severe snowstorms in late December 2010.

In May 2011, the Brigade Headquarters Company (HHC) plus the UAV Platoon (B/116 BSTB) were mobilized in support of Operation Enduring Freedom. Approximately 185 Soldiers were mobilized for this deployment. They served as the control element for Combined Team Zabul in Zabul Province, Afghanistan. During their deployment, the HHC directed a mix of US Active Duty and National Guard units as well as Romanian units in continuing operations in Zabul Province. They were commanded by COL Blake Ortner and suffered no combat casualties during the deployment. The brigade HHC returned to the US and demobilized at the beginning of January 2012.

In June 2011, Task Force 183 (TF183) mobilized to support Operation New Dawn. This was the largest mobilization of the Virginia Army National Guard since WWII, consisting of 825 soldiers. TF183 comprised most of the 2d Squadron, 183d Cavalry Regiment plus elements of the 116th BSTB, 116th BSB, 1-116 Infantry and D Co 3-116 Infantry. TF183 returned to the US and demobilized in December 2011.

On 15 October 2016, the Brigade Special Troops Battalion became the 229th Brigade Engineer Battalion.

In October 2025, the 116th was officially designated as a Mobile Brigade Combat Team. This transition included the acquisition of further capabilities aimed to increase mobility and battlefield awareness.

== Organization 2025 ==
- 116th Mobile Brigade Combat Team, in Staunton
  - Headquarters and Headquarters Company, 116th Mobile Brigade Combat Team, in Staunton
  - 2nd Squadron, 183rd Cavalry Regiment, in Portsmouth (Scheduled for inactivation in September 2026)
    - Headquarters and Headquarters Troop, 2nd Squadron, 183rd Cavalry Regiment, in Portsmouth
    - Troop A, 2nd Squadron, 183rd Cavalry Regiment, in Virginia Beach
    - Troop B, 2nd Squadron, 183rd Cavalry Regiment, in Suffolk
    - Troop C (Dismounted), 2nd Squadron, 183rd Cavalry Regiment, in Virginia Beach
  - 1st Battalion, 116th Infantry Regiment, in Lynchburg
    - Headquarters and Headquarters Company, 1st Battalion, 116th Infantry Regiment, in Lynchburg
    - Company A, 1st Battalion, 116th Infantry Regiment, in Bedford
      - Detachment 1, Company A, 1st Battalion, 116th Infantry Regiment, in Farmville
    - Company B, 1st Battalion, 116th Infantry Regiment, in Suffolk
    - Company C, 1st Battalion, 116th Infantry Regiment, in Christiansburg
      - Detachment 1, Company C, 1st Battalion, 116th Infantry Regiment, in Lexington
    - Company D (Weapons), 1st Battalion, 116th Infantry Regiment, in Pulaski
  - 3rd Battalion, 116th Infantry Regiment, in Winchester
    - Headquarters and Headquarters Company, 3rd Battalion, 116th Infantry Regiment, in Winchester
    - Company A, 3rd Battalion, 116th Infantry Regiment, in Charlottesville
      - Detachment 1, Company A, 3rd Battalion, 116th Infantry Regiment, in Harrisonburg
    - Company B, 3rd Battalion, 116th Infantry Regiment, in Woodstock
    - Company C, 3rd Battalion, 116th Infantry Regiment, in Leesburg
    - Company D (Weapons), 3rd Battalion, 116th Infantry Regiment, in Warrenton
  - 1st Battalion, 149th Infantry Regiment, in Barbourville (KY) — (Kentucky Army National Guard)
    - Headquarters and Headquarters Company, 1st Battalion, 149th Infantry Regiment, in Barbourville (KY)
    - Company A, 1st Battalion, 149th Infantry Regiment, in Middlesboro (KY)
      - Detachment 1, Company A, 1st Battalion, 149th Infantry Regiment, in Williamsburg (KY)
    - Company B, 1st Battalion, 149th Infantry Regiment, in Hopkinsville (KY)
      - Detachment 1, Company B, 1st Battalion, 149th Infantry Regiment, in Brandenburg (KY)
    - Company C, 1st Battalion, 149th Infantry Regiment, in Ravenna (KY)
    - Company D (Weapons), 1st Battalion, 149th Infantry Regiment, in Springfield (KY)
      - Detachment 1, Company D (Weapons), 1st Battalion, 149th Infantry Regiment, in Somerset (KY)
  - 1st Battalion, 111th Field Artillery Regiment, in Norfolk
    - Headquarters and Headquarters Battery, 1st Battalion, 111th Field Artillery Regiment, in Norfolk
      - Detachment 1, Headquarters and Headquarters Battery, 1st Battalion, 111th Field Artillery Regiment, in Hampton
    - Battery A, 1st Battalion, 111th Field Artillery Regiment, in Hanover
      - Detachment 1, Battery A, 1st Battalion, 111th Field Artillery Regiment, in Manassas
    - Battery B, 1st Battalion, 111th Field Artillery Regiment, in Norfolk
    - Battery C, 1st Battalion, 111th Field Artillery Regiment, in Hampton
      - Detachment 1, Battery C, 1st Battalion, 111th Field Artillery Regiment, at Fort Pickett
  - 229th Brigade Engineer Battalion, in Fredericksburg (Scheduled for inactivation in September 2026)
    - Headquarters and Headquarters Company, 229th Brigade Engineer Battalion, in Fredericksburg
    - Company A (Combat Engineer), 229th Brigade Engineer Battalion, in Fredericksburg
    - Company B (Combat Engineer), 229th Brigade Engineer Battalion, in Bowling Green
    - Company C (Signal), 229th Brigade Engineer Battalion, in Fredericksburg
    - Company D (Military Intelligence), 229th Brigade Engineer Battalion, in Manassas
  - 429th Light Support Battalion, in Danville
    - Headquarters and Distribution Company, 429th Light Support Battalion, in Danville
    - Company A (Maintenance), 429th Light Support Battalion, in Richmond
    - Company B (Medical), 429th Light Support Battalion, in Charlottesville
    - Company C (Forward Support), 429th Light Support Battalion, in Lynchburg — attached to 1st Battalion, 116th Infantry Regiment
    - Company D (Forward Support), 429th Light Support Battalion, in Winchester — attached to 3rd Battalion, 116th Infantry Regiment
    - Company E (Forward Support), 429th Light Support Battalion, in London (KY) — attached to 1st Battalion, 149th Infantry Regiment (Kentucky Army National Guard)
    - Company F (Forward Support), 429th Light Support Battalion, in Norfolk — attached to 1st Battalion, 111th Field Artillery Regiment

== Organization 2026 ==
- 116th Mobile Brigade Combat Team, in Staunton
  - Headquarters and Headquarters Company, 116th Mobile Brigade Combat Team, in Staunton
  - 1st Battalion, 116th Infantry Regiment, in Lynchburg
    - Headquarters and Headquarters Company, 1st Battalion, 116th Infantry Regiment, in Lynchburg
    - Company A, 1st Battalion, 116th Infantry Regiment, in Bedford
      - Detachment 1, Company A, 1st Battalion, 116th Infantry Regiment, in Farmville
    - Company B, 1st Battalion, 116th Infantry Regiment, in Suffolk
    - Company C, 1st Battalion, 116th Infantry Regiment, in Christiansburg
      - Detachment 1, Company C, 1st Battalion, 116th Infantry Regiment, in Lexington
    - Company D (Multi-purpose Company), 1st Battalion, 116th Infantry Regiment, in Pulaski
  - 3rd Battalion, 116th Infantry Regiment, in Winchester
    - Headquarters and Headquarters Company, 3rd Battalion, 116th Infantry Regiment, in Winchester
    - Company A, 3rd Battalion, 116th Infantry Regiment, in Charlottesville
      - Detachment 1, Company A, 3rd Battalion, 116th Infantry Regiment, in Harrisonburg
    - Company B, 3rd Battalion, 116th Infantry Regiment, in Woodstock
    - Company C, 3rd Battalion, 116th Infantry Regiment, in Leesburg
    - Company D (Multi-purpose Company), 3rd Battalion, 116th Infantry Regiment, in Warrenton
  - 1st Battalion, 149th Infantry Regiment, in Barbourville (KY) — (Kentucky Army National Guard)
    - Headquarters and Headquarters Company, 1st Battalion, 149th Infantry Regiment, in Barbourville (KY)
    - Company A, 1st Battalion, 149th Infantry Regiment, in Middlesboro (KY)
      - Detachment 1, Company A, 1st Battalion, 149th Infantry Regiment, in Williamsburg (KY)
    - Company B, 1st Battalion, 149th Infantry Regiment, in Hopkinsville (KY)
      - Detachment 1, Company B, 1st Battalion, 149th Infantry Regiment, in Brandenburg (KY)
    - Company C, 1st Battalion, 149th Infantry Regiment, in Ravenna (KY)
    - Company D (Multi-purpose Company), 1st Battalion, 149th Infantry Regiment, in Springfield (KY)
      - Detachment 1, Company D (Weapons), 1st Battalion, 149th Infantry Regiment, in Somerset (KY)
  - Multi-Functional Reconnaissance Company, in Portsmouth
  - Combat Engineer Company — Infantry, in Fredericksburg
  - Signal Company, in Fredericksburg
  - Military Intelligence Company, in Manassas

=== Aligned units ===
29th Infantry Division units aligned with the 116th Mobile Brigade Combat Team:

- 29th Division Artillery
  - 1st Battalion, 111th Field Artillery Regiment, in Norfolk
    - Headquarters and Headquarters Battery, 1st Battalion, 111th Field Artillery Regiment, in Norfolk
      - Detachment 1, Headquarters and Headquarters Battery, 1st Battalion, 111th Field Artillery Regiment, in Hampton
    - Battery A, 1st Battalion, 111th Field Artillery Regiment, in Hanover
      - Detachment 1, Battery A, 1st Battalion, 111th Field Artillery Regiment, in Manassas
    - Battery B, 1st Battalion, 111th Field Artillery Regiment, in Norfolk
    - Battery C, 1st Battalion, 111th Field Artillery Regiment, in Hampton
      - Detachment 1, Battery C, 1st Battalion, 111th Field Artillery Regiment, at Fort Pickett
    - Service Battery, 1st Battalion, 111th Field Artillery Regiment, in Norfolk
- 29th Division Sustainment Brigade
  - 429th Light Support Battalion, in Danville
    - Headquarters and Distribution Company, 429th Light Support Battalion, in Danville
    - Company A (Maintenance and Supply), 429th Light Support Battalion, in Richmond
    - Company B (Medical), 429th Light Support Battalion, in Charlottesville
    - Company C (Combat Logistic), 429th Light Support Battalion, in Lynchburg — aligned with the 1st Battalion, 116th Infantry Regiment
    - Company D (Combat Logistic), 429th Light Support Battalion, in Winchester — aligned with the 3rd Battalion, 116th Infantry Regiment
    - Company E (Combat Logistic), 429th Light Support Battalion, in London (KY) — aligned with the 1st Battalion, 149th Infantry Regiment (Kentucky Army National Guard)

== Insignia ==
The brigade had its own shoulder patch which was most recently worn in 2006–2007. The shoulder sleeve insignia depicted Thomas "Stonewall" Jackson mounted on his horse, a reference to the 116th's lineage as the Stonewall Brigade. The shoulder sleeve insignia was originally approved for the 116th Infantry Brigade on 26 May 1978. The patch's nickname is "Stony on a Pony." When the 29th Infantry Division was reactivated in 1985, the brigade was assigned to the division and began wearing the division shoulder patch. Following the Army's reorganization of combat divisions in 2005 into brigade-centric units, ARNG brigades within divisions began wearing brigade patches as Department of the Army policy. The 116th BCT returned to wearing the division shoulder patch on 1 April 2007.

== Shoulder sleeve insignia ==
- Description

On an oblong shield curved at top and bottom, 2 1/2 inches (6.4 cm) in width and 3 inches (7.6 cm) in height overall, a gray silhouette representative of the Stonewall Jackson Monument at Manassas Battlefield Park, Virginia, on a blue background all within a 1/8 inch (0.32 cm) white border.

- Symbolism

The equestrian figure is a representation of the General Thomas J. Jackson Monument at Manassas where he gained the nickname "Stonewall". The colors blue and gray refer to the rich heritage of the state of Virginia and blue and white are the colors associated with the Infantry Branch.

- Background

The shoulder sleeve insignia was originally approved for the 116th Infantry Brigade on 26 May 1978. It was redesignated for the 116th Infantry Brigade Combat Team with the description updated on 7 April 2006. The insignia was canceled effective 1 April 2007, when the unit became a Brigade of a Division. (TIOH Drawing Number A-1-621)

== Distinctive unit insignia ==
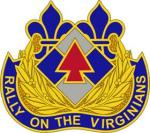
116 IBCT DUI

- Description

A gold color metal and enamel device 1 1/4 inches (3.2 cm) in width overall consisting of a quartered square placed point up, the vertical quarters gray, horizontal quarters blue, and centered thereon a scarlet arrowhead point up, the lower sides of the square enclosed by two gold branches of laurel issuant from the lower center and terminating below the outer petals of two blue fleurs-de-lis issuant from the upper sides of the square, the laurel branches contained in base by a curving blue scroll inscribed with the words "RALLY ON THE VIRGINIANS" in gold letters.

- Symbolism

The blue and gray square at center refers to four years of Civil War participation, with the gray in the vertical quarters indicating Confederate service. The two fleurs-de-lis denote service in World War I and II and the scarlet arrowhead is in honor of the unit's participation in the assault landing at Normandy. The two branches of laurel symbolize awards of both the Presidential Unit Citation and the French Croix de Guerre with Palm for the unit's Normandy Beachhead participation. The motto is a reference to the Civil War First Battle of Manassas where General Barnard Bee, on seeing General Jackson "standing like a stone wall", encouraged his faltering troops to "Rally on the Virginians". From that time on Jackson was known as "Stonewall" and his brigade as the "Stonewall Brigade".

- Background

The distinctive unit insignia was originally approved for the 116th Infantry Brigade on 24 April 1979. It was amended to change the reference in the symbolism on 15 July 1980. The insignia was redesignated for the 116th Infantry Brigade Combat Team with the description updated on 7 April 2006. It was canceled effective 1 April 2007, when the unit became a Brigade of a Division.
