= Virginia National Guard =

Component of the US Army and military of the U.S. state of Virginia

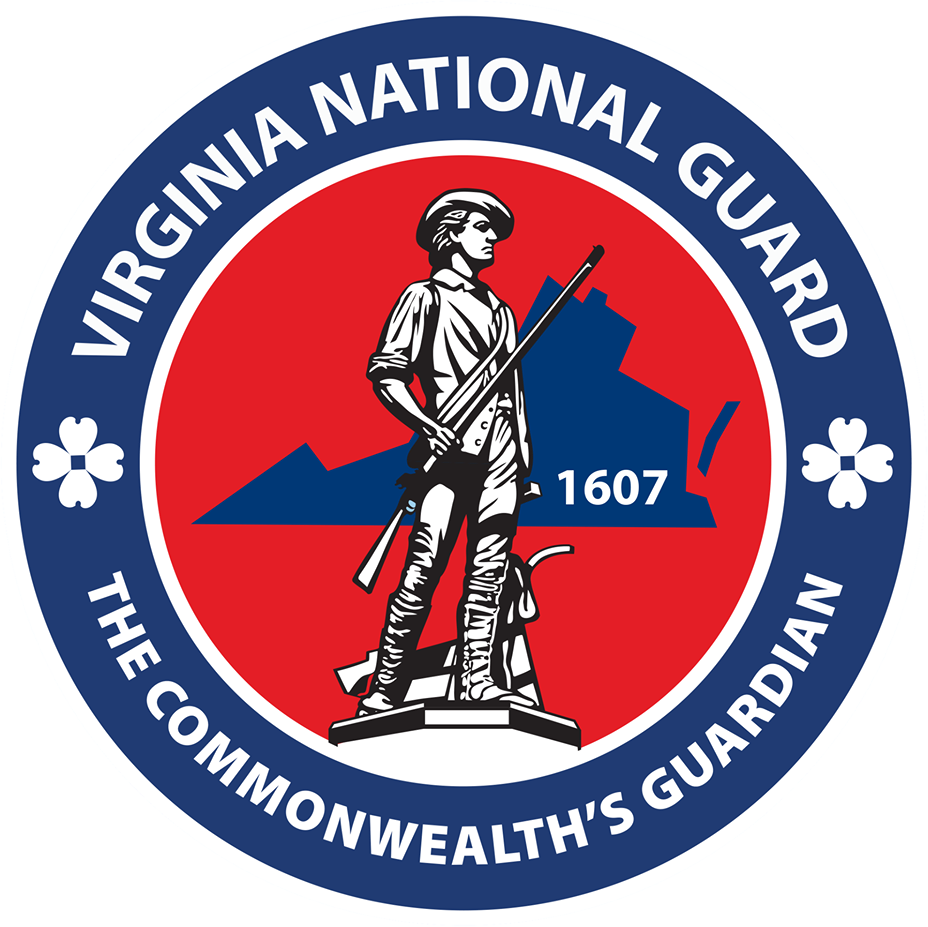
- Seal of the Virginia National Guard
- Founded: 1607
- Country: United States
- Allegiance: Virginia
- Branch: United States Army; U.S. Air Force
- Type: Military reserve force, Organized militia
- Role: "To meet Commonwealth and federal mission responsibilities."
- Part of: National Guard Bureau; National Guard; Virginia Department of Military Affairs
- Headquarters: Richmond, Virginia
- Motto: The Commonwealth's Guardians
- Engagements: American Revolution; Pancho Villa Expedition; World War I; World War II; January 6 United States Capitol attack
- Website: Virginia National Guard

Commanders
- Commander in Chief (Title 10 USC): President Donald Trump (when federalized)
- Commander in Chief (Title 32 USC): Governor Abigail Spanberger
- Adjutant General: MG James W. Ring

The Virginia National Guard is part of the National Guard of the United States, a dual federal-state military reserve force. It consists of the Virginia Army National Guard and Virginia Air National Guard. (The Virginia State Defense Force is the third military unit of the Virginia Department of Military Affairs, part of the state government of Virginia). The National Guard may be called into federal service in response to a call by the president of the United States in accordance with Title 10 of the United States Code.

== History ==
The Virginia National Guard traces the history and tradition of Citizen-Soldier service to the founding of Jamestown in 1607, and it boasts that there has been a military presence defending Virginia ever since. According to the Virginia National Guard, its history is divided into multiple eras typically defined by America's wars against foreign powers. During Virginia's colonial era (1607–1774), many Virginians served in the militia formed to protect the various towns and counties. In 1644 free-black colonists (mostly former slaves) were also allowed to enlist in the militia. Today the 276th Engineer Battalion carries the oldest continuous lineage from that period. During the French and Indian War (1755–1763) George Washington, served as a Lieutenant Colonel of the Virginia Regiment.

With the beginning of the American Revolution in 1775, most of the Virginia militia volunteered to fight the British. George Washington was appointed as the commander of the Continental Army and other Virginians soon became well-known military leaders: Daniel Morgan, George Rogers Clark, Hugh Mercer, and “Light Horse” Harry Lee. Four men who served in the Virginia Militia would later become president: George Washington, Thomas Jefferson, James Madison, and James Monroe.

The War of 1812 and War with Mexico: Once again Virginia supplied men and arms to defend the country and the state. The Virginia Military Institute (VMI) was established in 1839. During the 1854 War with Mexico, Virginia provided a Regiment of Volunteers to serve with the US Army.

The Civil War (1861–1865) and Spanish–American War (1898–1899): Virginia joined the Confederacy on 17 April 1861. The most famous Virginia Guardsman of the war was Thomas Jackson. From his brigade's performance at the Battle of Manassas the title of "Stonewall Brigade" was awarded to the Virginia Militia and still used today for the 116th Infantry. Robert E. Lee surrendered the Army of Northern Virginia at Appomattox Court House on 9 April 1865. After the Civil War the country and state were at peace until the Spanish–American War. Virginia provided regiments of militia including, for the first time, a regiment of African American militia. After the wars, Virginia militiamen served in state duty for riot control and law enforcement.

The Birth of the Modern National Guard (1903–1916): During the Spanish American War many problems in the existing State Militia system became obvious to all. In 1903 Congress enacted the first of several laws changing how the volunteer system would function. Among the provisions was a mandate that Guardsmen had to drill a minimum of 48 periods a year along with 15 days of "annual training." Enlisted men were now issued standard army uniforms and were trained to Army standards. As a requirement of the law the "Virginia Volunteers" designation was changed to "Virginia National Guard."

The Mexican Border Campaign: In 1916 Mexican bandits raided Columbus, N.M., and then fled back over the border. President Woodrow Wilson ordered the Army to pursue them into Mexico and later mobilized 100,000 National Guardsmen to patrol and protect the border against further raids. From Virginia came two infantry regiments, a battalion of field artillery, one cavalry squadron and companies of engineers and signal troops, for a total of 4,000 men. In early 1917 the Virginia units returned home after serving six months on the border.

World War I (1917–1918): America declared war on Germany on 6 April 1917. By July the Virginia Guard was mobilized and moved to Camp McClellan, Alabama. Two Companies of Coastal Artillerymen were assigned to the 42nd "Rainbow" Division and would serve there for the entire war. At McClellan, the Army combined the Virginia infantry regiments into one large regiment and redesignated it as the 116th Infantry, 29th Division. Virginia's field artillery units were consolidated into the 111th Field Artillery, 29th Division. The 1st Virginia Cavalry was redesignated as the 104th Ammunition Train, 29th Division. While at McClellan the 29th Division, composed of Guard units from Delaware, Maryland, New Jersey and Virginia, adopted the nickname it still carries today, "Blue and Gray." On 8 October 1918, the 29th was an assault element in the great Meuse Argonne Offensive. In late October, the 29th was pulled out of the line to rest and prepare for the next attack. This attack was not needed as the war ended on 11 November 1918 with the Armistice.

World War II (1941–1945): After a lean interwar period, the Guard was again needed for the Second World War. The 29th trained at Fort Meade and then reorganized, losing the 176th Infantry and the 29th Tank Company to other units. The 116th remained in the 29th along with two Maryland infantry regiments. The 111th Field Artillery Regiment was broken into two parts; the 111th Field Artillery Battalion and the 227th Field Artillery Battalion, The 29th arrived in Britain in October 1942 and began training. The morning of 6 June 1944, to be known forever as "D-Day," saw the largest invasion in history launched against five beaches on the coast of Normandy, France. One beach, code named "Omaha," will always be remembered in Virginia history as "bloody Omaha" due to the more than 800 members of the 116th Infantry who were killed, wounded or missing during the amphibious assault. The 111th also took part on D-Day and lost most of their equipment in the attack. A total of 32 members of the 111th died trying to gain a foothold on Omaha Beach. After D-Day the 29th fought major battles at St Lo, Brest, Julich, and a number of other places until 8 May 1945 when the war in Europe ended with a German surrender. During its 335 days in combat operations the 116th Infantry suffered 7,113 men killed, wounded or missing. The 111th Field Artillery Battalion lost 43 men killed in action.

The Cold War (1946–1989): During the 43 years of the Cold War, many changes occurred in the Virginia Guard including the addition of the 149th Fighter Squadron, the Commonwealth's first Air National Guard unit. No Virginia Guard unit fought in the Korean War or in Viet Nam but some units were activated during the Berlin Wall crisis in 1961. African-Americans were recruited into the Virginia Guard the late 1960s and the first female soldier joined in 1973.

Operations Desert Shield/Storm and Peacekeeping (1990–2001): Two truck companies, two engineer headquarters companies, a helicopter medical evacuation detachment, one company of military police and another of personnel services plus a military history detachment of the VANG served in the desert. In total, 710 VANG personnel (including 105 females) served in theater. After the war Virginia Guardsmen were deployed to the Sinai, Bosnia, and Kosovo for peacekeeping missions.

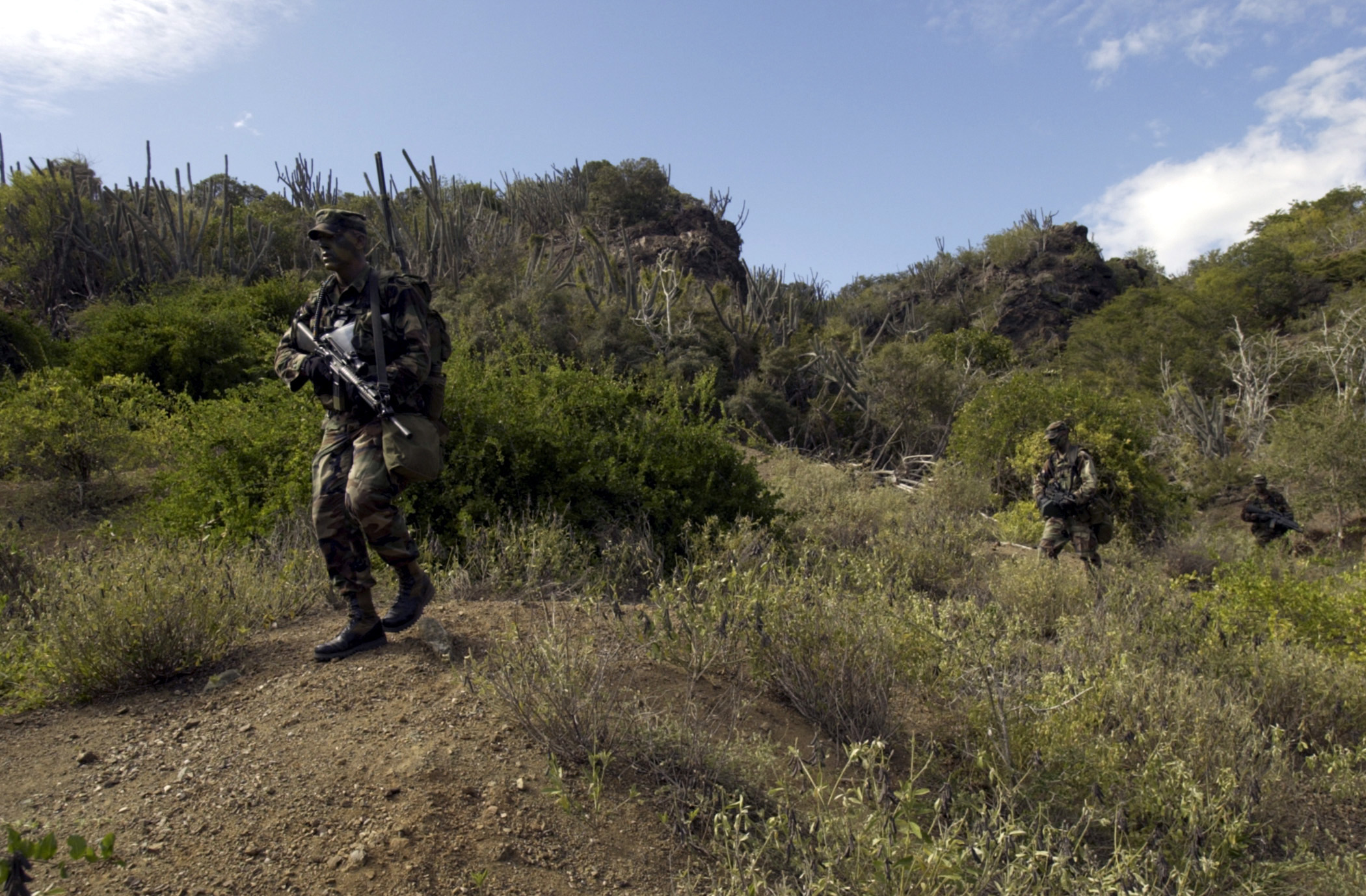
Soldiers of the Virginia Army National Guard's 116th Infantry Regiment in 2003

Global war on terrorism (11 September 2001 to present): After the attacks, the VANG provided security to government installations and critical infrastructure as well as flying security patrols. In early 2002 approximately 70 soldiers of Virginia's Company B, 3rd Bn, 20th Special Forces Group, were mobilized and deployed to Afghanistan. Captured enemy combatants were brought to the U.S. Naval Base at Guantanamo Bay, Cuba, for detention. To guard the base the 2nd Bn, 116th Infantry was mobilized on 2 November 2002; the first Virginia National Guard battalion to deploy overseas for other than training since World War II. In 2003 the U.S. invaded Iraq to locate and destroy weapons of mass destruction. Three VANG units were in theater during the Iraq invasion, two in the initial attack, and the third entering Iraq later. The HHD, 1030th Engineer Battalion, and the 1032nd Transportation Company accompanied the invasion forces entering Iraq. In September 2003, as the situation in Iraq deteriorated, 300 Air Guard personnel from the 192nd Fighter Wing, along with several of the unit’s F-16 fighters, deployed to Qatar and the pilots flew combat cover missions over Iraq. Over the intervening years, several Air Guard units served in Iraq or were split between Iraq and Afghanistan. The 192nd Security Force Squadron served in OIF in 2006. From late 2006 into early 2007 the 203rd RED HORSE flight served in OIF, with elements also in OEF performing various construction missions. As the war increased and decreased in scope, more and more VANG units were mobilized and deployed to OIF and OEF. This trend continues today as Virginia Guardsmen deploy to trouble spots throughout the world.

During the January 6 United States Capitol attack, the Virginia National Guard was activated and sent to Washington DC to help restore order.

== Leadership ==
Major General Timothy P. Williams was appointed by Virginia governor Terry McAuliffe on Wednesday, May 14, 2014, and has served as the Adjutant General of Virginia since June 1, 2014.

== Organization ==
Virginia Army National Guard

Current units

- Fort Barfoot Maneuver Training Center, Blackstone, Virginia
  - 34th Civil Support Team
- Camp Pendleton State Military Reservation, Virginia Beach, Virginia
- 29th Infantry Division
  - 116th Infantry Brigade Combat Team – 'Stonewall Brigade'
    - 1st Battalion, 116th Infantry Regiment – 'Red Dragons'
    - 3rd Battalion, 116th Infantry Regiment
    - 2nd Squadron (RSTA), 183rd Cavalry Regiment
    - 1st Battalion, 111th Field Artillery Regiment
    - 229th Brigade Engineer Battalion
    - 429th Brigade Support Battalion
- 91st Cyber Brigade
  - 123rd Cyber Protection Battalion
  - 124th Cyber Protection Battalion
- 329th Regional Support Group
  - 276th Engineer Battalion
  - 529th Combat Sustainment Support Battalion
  - 1030th Transportation Battalion
- 2nd Battalion, 224th Aviation Regiment
- 183rd Regiment, Regional Training Institute

Virginia Air National Guard

Current Units

- 192nd Wing
  - 149th Fighter Squadron

=== Other organizations ===
Many states also maintain their own military forces. These forces are federally recognized, but are separate from the United States National Guard Bureau and are not meant to be federalized, but rather service the state exclusively, especially when the National Guard is deployed and unavailable. The Virginia Defense Force is the commonwealth's own all-volunteer, formal military organization that is the reserve to the Virginia National Guard.

== Famous members ==
- Four presidents of the United States served as members of the Virginia Guard during the colonial period and early Republic, they were George Washington, Thomas Jefferson, James Madison, and James Monroe.
- Thomas Jackson, the leader of the famous Stonewall Brigade, was a member of the Virginia Guard during the American Civil War. Jackson alongside much of the Virginia Guard had sided with the Confederacy.

== Awards and decorations ==
List of decorations awarded by the Virginia National Guard

== See also ==
- Virginia Defense Force
- Virginia Military Institute
