= 429th Light Support Battalion =

429th Light Support Battalion Formerly the 246th Field Artillery (1959-2005)
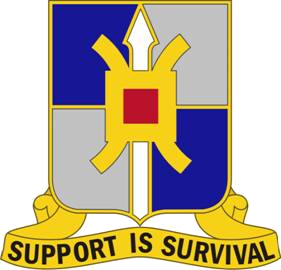
- Coat of arms
- Active: 1924 - present
- Country: United States
- Branch: Army
- Type: Combat service support
- Part of: 116th Mobile Brigade Combat Team (VA ARNG)
- Garrison/HQ: Fort Monroe (1940–1944); Fort Macon (1944–1945)
- Motto: This is the way
- Mascot: Oozlefinch (1924–1968)

The 429th Light Support Battalion (429th BSB) is a combat service support battalion of the United States Army and the Virginia National Guard. It is part of the 116th Mobile Brigade Combat Team, Virginia Army National Guard.

The 429th BSB draws its heritage and history from the 246th Field Artillery, a Field Artillery Branch regiment active from 1959 to 2005. In turn, the 246th FA drew its history from the 246th Coast Artillery, a Coast Artillery Corps regiment in the Virginia National Guard. It garrisoned the Harbor Defenses of Chesapeake Bay (HD Chesapeake), Virginia 1924–1944.

== History ==
The 246th Coast Artillery was organized 12 August 1924 as the Virginia National Guard component of the Harbor Defenses of Chesapeake Bay (HD Chesapeake), Virginia. The regiment's principal armory was in Lynchburg, Virginia. The 12th Coast Artillery was the Regular Army component of those defenses 1924–1932, and the 2nd Coast Artillery was the Regular Army component 1932–1944.

The regiment was initially organized 15 December 1921 by redesignating the 1st through 6th companies, Coast Artillery Corps, Virginia National Guard as the 1st Provisional Regiment, CAC, VA NG. Redesignated as the 1st Coast Defense Command, VA NG, 1 April 1922. Redesignated as the 246th Artillery, CAC VA NG 5 November 1923, and 246th Coast Artillery Regiment 12 August 1924.

Inducted into federal service 16 September 1940 at Lynchburg, Virginia and moved to Fort Monroe in HD Chesapeake 24 September 1940. The regimental HQ and HQ Battery (HHB), 2nd Battalion HHB, and Batteries D and F were initially at Fort Monroe, with the remainder at Fort Story. The regiment's commander in 1940 was Colonel Alonzo E. Wood. On 19 December 1940 the regimental HHB moved to Fort Story, with Battery H moving to Fort Monroe.

On 20 April 1944 the regiment, less HHB and Batteries A and B, was inactivated. The remaining components moved to Fort Macon in the Temporary Harbor Defenses (THD) of Beaufort, North Carolina. On 1 October 1944 the HHB became HHB, THD Beaufort, and Batteries A and B became the 246th and 247th Coast Artillery Batteries.

The regiment (less former Batteries A and B) was reconstituted 25 August 1945 in the Virginia National Guard.

The former 1st Battalion, 246th Coast Artillery, was converted and redesignated 2 July 1946 as the 560th Field Artillery Battalion. Reorganized and Federally recognized 31 March 1948 with headquarters at Danville. Ordered into active Federal service 1 May 1951 at home stations; released 18 March 1955 from active Federal service and reverted to state control. The former 2d Battalion, 246th Coast Artillery, was converted and redesignated 2 July 1946 as the 227th Field Artillery Battalion and assigned to the 29th Infantry Division.

The 560th and 227th Field Artillery Battalions were consolidated 1 June 1959 with Headquarters, 246th Coast Artillery; 418th Antiaircraft Artillery Battalion and the 213th Antiaircraft Artillery Detachment to form the 246th Artillery, a parent regiment under the Combat Arms Regimental System, to consist of the 1st Howitzer Battalion and 2d Rocket Howitzer Battalion, elements of the 29th Infantry Division; 3d Automatic Weapons Battalion; and the 4th Detachment. Reorganized 22 March 1963 to consist of the 1st and 2d Battalions, elements of the 29th Infantry Division, 3d Automatic Weapons Battalion, and the 4th Detachment. Reorganized 1 February 1968 to consist of the 1st Battalion. Reorganized 1 December 1971 to consist of the 1st Battalion, an element of the 28th Infantry Division. Redesignated 1 May 1972 as the 246th Field Artillery. Reorganized 1 June 1975 to consist of the 1st Battalion. Reorganized 1 October 1976 to consist of the 1st Battalion, an element of the 116th Infantry Brigade. Reorganized 1 June 1986 to consist of the 1st Battalion, an element of the 29th Infantry Division. Withdrawn 11 August 1987 from the Combat Arms Regimental System and reorganized under the United States Army Regimental System.

In 2005, the 1st Battalion, 246th Field Artillery was redesignated as the 429th Light Support Battalion.

== Coat of arms ==
=== 246th Coast Artillery and 246th Field Artillery ===
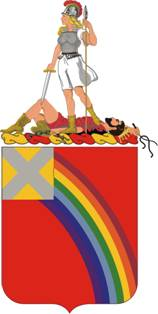
Coat of arms of 246th Coast Artillery and 246th Field Artillery

Through its Battery B, the 246th Coast Artillery traces its history back to 1856 and its coat of arms reflects the highlights of its past. The shield has artillery red for its background, indicative of its branch of service. The saltire, upper left hand corner, is in honor of the service of one of its units (the Danville Grays) in the Confederate Army in the American Civil War. The rainbow calls attention to the service several of its units saw in the Rainbow (42nd) Division of the First World War. The regimental motto – Prepared to Defend – is in keeping with its mission. For this unit, the shield of the coat of arms is also the distinctive unit insignia.

The coat of arms was redesignated for the 246th Artillery Regiment on 9 May 1960. The insignia was amended to add a motto on 18 September 1968. It was redesignated for the 246th Field Artillery Regiment on 24 July 1972.

The Regiment's crest is the seal of the Commonwealth of Virginia. The regimental colors carry two streamers in recognition of combat service in France in two major offensives: St. Mihiel, September 12-16, 1918; Meuse-Argonne, September 26 to November 11, 1918.

== See also ==
- Seacoast defense in the United States
- United States Army Coast Artillery Corps
- Harbor Defense Command
