= Virginia Army National Guard =

Component of the US Army and military of the U.S. state of Virginia

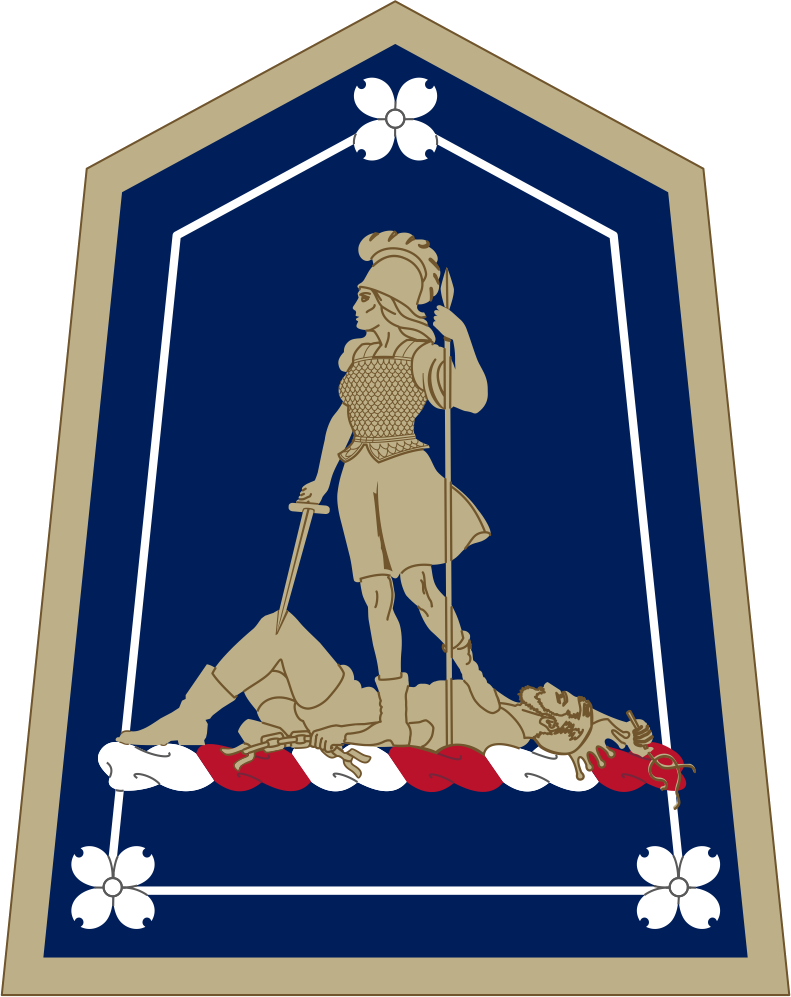
- Shoulder sleeve insignia of the Virginia National Guard Joint Force Headquarters–Army Element
- Founded: 1903
- Country: United States
- Allegiance: Virginia
- Branch: United States Army
- Type: ARNG Headquarters Command
- Role: United States Army National Guard
- Part of: Virginia National Guard
- Garrison/HQ: Sandston, Virginia
- Website: Virginia Army National Guard

Commanders
- Adjutant General: MG James W. Ring
- Land Component Commander: BG Charles B. Martin Jr.

Insignia
- Virginia Army National Guard Crest

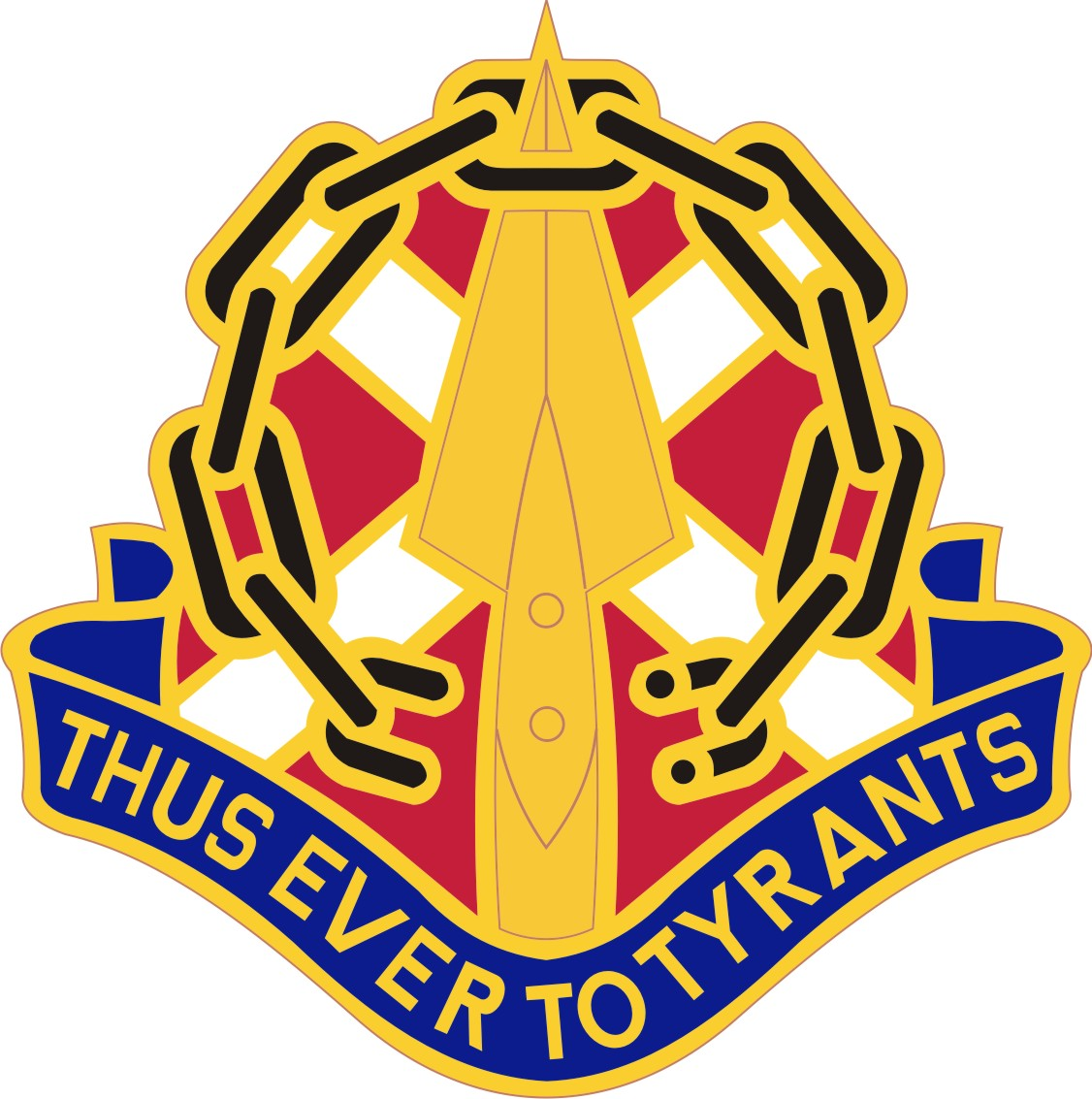
- Virginia Army National Guard STARC DUI

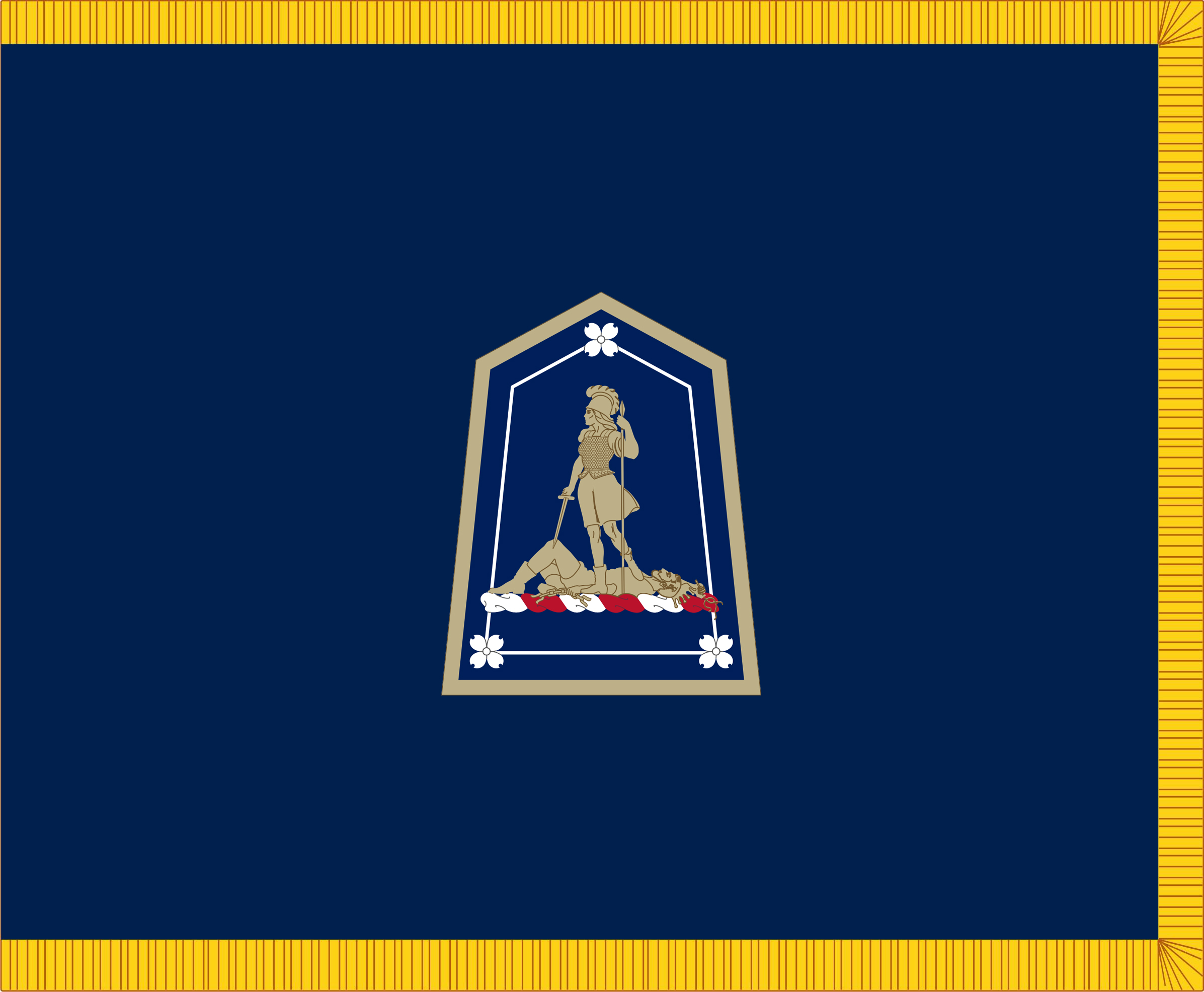
- Virginia Army National Guard Headquarters Flag

The Virginia Army National Guard is the land militia of the American Commonwealth (State) of Virginia. It is composed of approximately 7,200 soldiers and maintains 46 armories in communities throughout the State of Virginia.

The governor may call individuals or units of the Virginia National Guard into state service during emergencies or to assist in special situations which lend themselves to use of the National Guard. The state mission assigned to the National Guard is:

The Virginia National Guard provides the premier ready, relevant, and responsive Army and Air National Guard and Virginia Defense Force (personnel and units) to support and defend the Constitution of the United States and the Constitution of the Commonwealth of Virginia. The forces must anticipate requirements and rapidly deploy where directed while executing the orders of the President of the United States and the Governor of Virginia in order to save lives, protect people and property, ensure safety and relieve suffering.

Virginia Army National Guard units are trained and equipped as part of the United States Army. The same enlisted ranks and officer ranks and insignia are used and National Guardsmen are eligible to receive all United States military awards. The Virginia Guard also bestows a number of state awards for local services rendered in or to the commonwealth of Virginia.

== History ==
The Virginia Army National Guard is the oldest and the official start of the Army National Guard. The Militia Act of 1903 organized the various state militias into the present National Guard system.

=== British Colonial Militia ===
When the first English colonists arrived in North America they brought with them an existing militia system developed over centuries. Great Britain, being an island nation, never had a need to have large standing armies like the countries of mainland Europe. The only threats had to come by sea and in the days of wind-powered ships there was always forewarning, such as during the Spanish Armada in 1588. To be prepared to meet impending threats all men within each county (which usually made up one or more regiments) were required to "muster" or "mobilize" a day or two each year so their names could be entered on the rolls and they could at least familiarize themselves with weapons, usually furnished by the government, stored in a common location called an "armory." The commanders of each of these regiments were the high-born men of the county, often lords of noble birth. The men were told they were expected to turn out when called for an emergency but in reality they were still civilian farmers or shop keepers and only part-time soldiers. Once the crisis passed they returned to their homes and trades. This was the system brought over from England. It was modified once the English arrived because there were constant threats for local natives and Spanish raiders. So part of the militia had to always be armed and in readiness in case of sudden attack.

=== Virginia State forces ===
The HHT/2-183rd Cavalry and the 276th Engineer Battalion are two of only nineteen Army National Guard units with campaign credit for the War of 1812.

=== Virginia National Guard ===
During the 43 years of the Cold War, many changes occurred in the Virginia Guard, perhaps none more significant than the organization in 1946 of the 149th Fighter Squadron in Sandston, the Commonwealth's first Air National Guard unit (VA ANG). Thus the land force components became the Virginia Army National Guard (VA ARNG).

While many of the pre-war units, such as the 116th Infantry and 111th Field Artillery, were reformed in the Virginia Army National Guard in the mid to late 1940s, new units were organized into the force to meet the new threats posed by the Soviets. The most obvious of these were the antiaircraft artillery (AAA) battalions created to defend Washington, D.C., and Hampton Roads from air attack. Initially armed with guns firing "flak" these were, in the mid-1950s, replaced by Nike missiles capable of destroying enemy aircraft before they could hit their targets. And the structure of the state force expanded beyond only combat arms to include specialized support units including military police, medical, transportation, engineers, signal, data processing and even a military history detachment.

In 1959 the 246th Coast Artillery became the 246th Field Artillery, with its 1st and 2d Battalions forming part of the 29th Infantry Division.

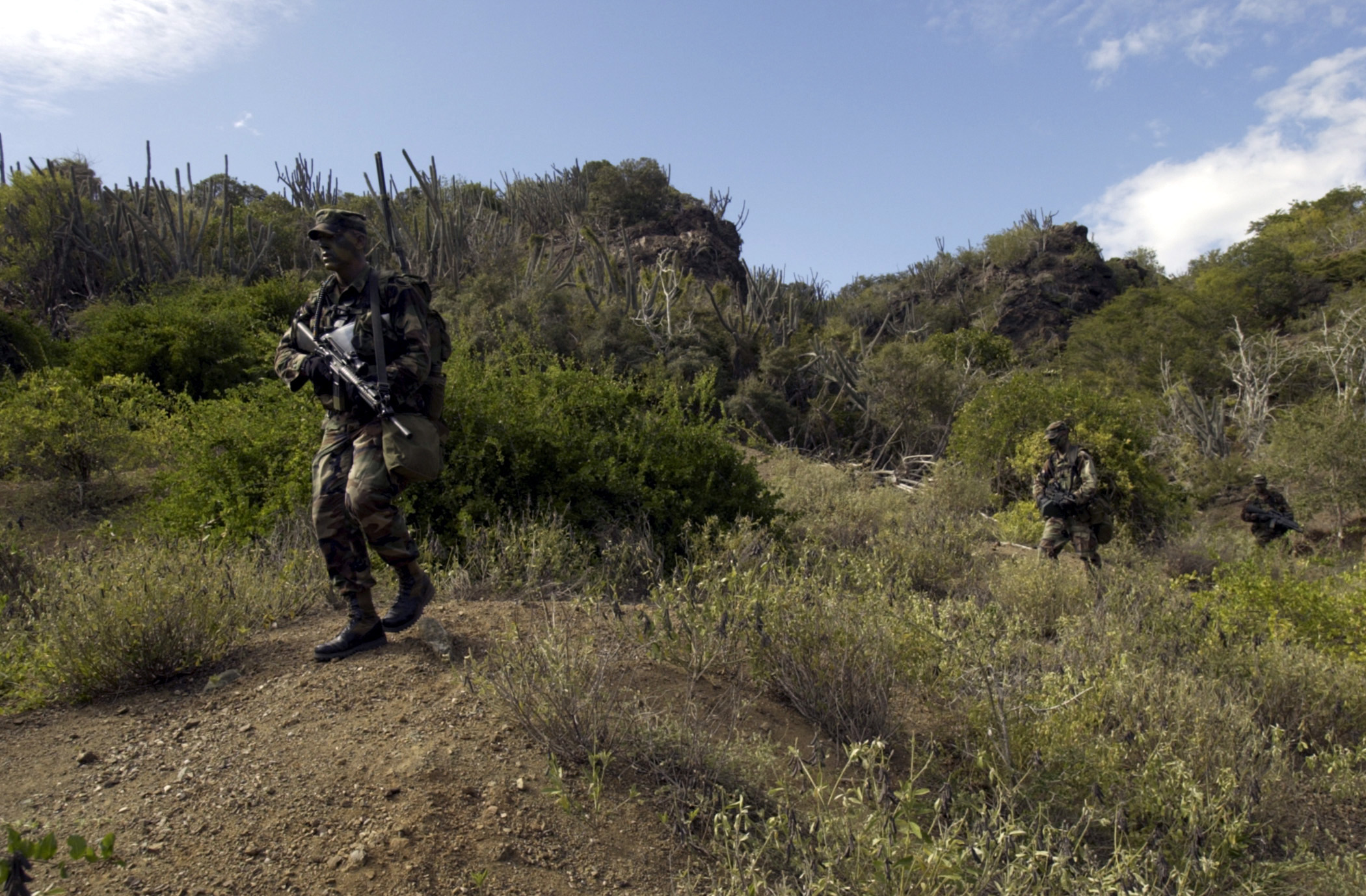
Soldiers of the 116th Infantry Regiment in 2003

The former Headquarters, 29th Infantry Division Artillery, was withdrawn 1 October 1997 from Headquarters and Service Battery, 1st Battalion, 111th Field Artillery, reorganized and redesignated as Headquarters and Headquarters Battery, 54th Field Artillery Brigade, and had its location changed to Virginia Beach. From that point, the Headquarters and Service Battery, 1st Battalion, 111th Field Artillery had a separate lineage. After active Federal service in 2004-05, it was converted and reorganized September 1, 2008, as Headquarters and Headquarters Company, 329th Regional Support Group. The RSG consists of the 276th Engineer Battalion, the 529th Combat Sustainment Support Battalion and the 1030th Transportation Battalion. The 329th Regional Support Group provides base operations support, and can manage facilities, provide administrative and logistical support for soldiers, and ensure the security of personnel and facilities on a base camp.

Separately from the previous 54th Field Artillery Brigade, on September 6, 2025, the Virginia Army National Guard formally reactivated the 29th Infantry Division Artillery (DIVARTY), during a ceremony at the Virginia War Memorial in Richmond, Virginia. Maj. Gen. James W. Ring, the Adjutant General of Virginia, presided over the ceremony featuring the uncasing of colors for the Divisional Artillery and the Divisional Artillery's Headquarters and Headquarters Battery. “In preparation for the Army’s focus on Large Scale Combat Operations, the U.S. Army is reintroducing DIVARTYs back into the National Guard."

=== Organization ===
As of February 2026 the Virginia Army National Guard consists of the following units:

- Joint Force Headquarters-Virginia, Army Element, at Defense Supply Center Richmond
  - Headquarters and Headquarters Detachment, Joint Force Headquarters-Virginia, Army Element, at Defense Supply Center Richmond
  - Virginia Recruiting & Retention Battalion, at Fort Pickett
  - Virginia Medical Detachment, at Fort Pickett
  - 34th Civil Support Team (WMD), at Fort Pickett
  - 134th Chaplain Detachment, at Fort Pickett
  - Fort Pickett Maneuver Training Center in Blackstone
    - Headquarters and Headquarters Detachment, at Fort Pickett Maneuver Training Center
  - Army Aviation Support Facility #1, at Richmond Airport
  - Combined Support Maintenance Shop #1, at Defense Supply Center Richmond
  - Combined Support Maintenance Shop #2, in Troutville
  - Maneuver Area Training Equipment Site #1, at Fort Pickett
  - Field Maintenance Shop #3, in Winchester
  - Field Maintenance Shop #5, in Norfolk
  - Field Maintenance Shop #6, in Portsmouth
  - Field Maintenance Shop #8, in Danville
  - Field Maintenance Shop #9, in Gate City
  - Field Maintenance Shop #11, in Lynchburg
  - Field Maintenance Shop #14, in Cedar Bluff
  - Field Maintenance Shop #15, at Fort Pickett
  - 29th Infantry Division, at Fort Belvoir
    - Headquarters and Headquarters Battalion, 29th Infantry Division, at Fort Belvoir
      - Headquarters Support Company, 29th Infantry Division, at Fort Belvoir
      - Company A (Operations), Headquarters and Headquarters Battalion, 29th Infantry Division, at Fort Belvoir
      - Company B (Intelligence and Sustainment), Headquarters and Headquarters Battalion, 29th Infantry Division, in Cheltenham (MD) — (Maryland Army National Guard)
      - Company C (Signal), Headquarters and Headquarters Battalion, 29th Infantry Division, in Laurel (MD) — (Maryland Army National Guard)
      - 29th Infantry Division Band, in Troutville
    - 48th Infantry Brigade Combat Team, in Macon (GA) — (Georgia Army National Guard)
    - 53rd Infantry Brigade Combat Team, in Pinellas Park (FL) — (Florida Army National Guard)
    - 116th Mobile Brigade Combat Team, in Staunton
      - Headquarters and Headquarters Company, 116th Mobile Brigade Combat Team, in Staunton
      - 2nd Squadron, 183rd Cavalry Regiment, in Portsmouth (Scheduled for inactivation in September 2026)
        - Headquarters and Headquarters Troop, 2nd Squadron, 183rd Cavalry Regiment, in Portsmouth
        - Troop A, 2nd Squadron, 183rd Cavalry Regiment, in Virginia Beach
        - Troop B, 2nd Squadron, 183rd Cavalry Regiment, in Suffolk
        - Troop C (Dismounted), 2nd Squadron, 183rd Cavalry Regiment, in Virginia Beach
      - 1st Battalion, 116th Infantry Regiment, in Lynchburg
        - Headquarters and Headquarters Company, 1st Battalion, 116th Infantry Regiment, in Lynchburg
        - Company A, 1st Battalion, 116th Infantry Regiment, in Bedford
          - Detachment 1, Company A, 1st Battalion, 116th Infantry Regiment, in Farmville
        - Company B, 1st Battalion, 116th Infantry Regiment, in Suffolk
        - Company C, 1st Battalion, 116th Infantry Regiment, in Christiansburg
          - Detachment 1, Company C, 1st Battalion, 116th Infantry Regiment, in Lexington
        - Company D (Weapons), 1st Battalion, 116th Infantry Regiment, in Pulaski
      - 3rd Battalion, 116th Infantry Regiment, in Winchester
        - Headquarters and Headquarters Company, 3rd Battalion, 116th Infantry Regiment, in Winchester
        - Company A, 3rd Battalion, 116th Infantry Regiment, in Charlottesville
          - Detachment 1, Company A, 3rd Battalion, 116th Infantry Regiment, in Harrisonburg
        - Company B, 3rd Battalion, 116th Infantry Regiment, in Woodstock
        - Company C, 3rd Battalion, 116th Infantry Regiment, in Leesburg
        - Company D (Weapons), 3rd Battalion, 116th Infantry Regiment, in Warrenton
      - 1st Battalion, 149th Infantry Regiment, in Barbourville (KY) — (Kentucky Army National Guard)
      - 1st Battalion, 111th Field Artillery Regiment, in Norfolk
        - Headquarters and Headquarters Battery, 1st Battalion, 111th Field Artillery Regiment, in Norfolk
          - Detachment 1, Headquarters and Headquarters Battery, 1st Battalion, 111th Field Artillery Regiment, in Hampton
        - Battery A, 1st Battalion, 111th Field Artillery Regiment, in Hanover
          - Detachment 1, Battery A, 1st Battalion, 111th Field Artillery Regiment, in Manassas
        - Battery B, 1st Battalion, 111th Field Artillery Regiment, in Norfolk
        - Battery C, 1st Battalion, 111th Field Artillery Regiment, in Hampton
          - Detachment 1, Battery C, 1st Battalion, 111th Field Artillery Regiment, at Fort Pickett
      - 229th Brigade Engineer Battalion, in Fredericksburg (Scheduled for inactivation in September 2026)
        - Headquarters and Headquarters Company, 229th Brigade Engineer Battalion, in Fredericksburg
        - Company A (Combat Engineer), 229th Brigade Engineer Battalion, in Fredericksburg
        - Company B (Combat Engineer), 229th Brigade Engineer Battalion, in Bowling Green
        - Company C (Signal), 229th Brigade Engineer Battalion, in Fredericksburg
        - Company D (Military Intelligence), 229th Brigade Engineer Battalion, in Manassas
      - 429th Light Support Battalion, in Danville
        - Headquarters and Distribution Company, 429th Light Support Battalion, in Danville
        - Company A (Maintenance), 429th Light Support Battalion, at Defense Supply Center Richmond
        - Company B (Medical), 429th Light Support Battalion, in Charlottesville
        - Company C (Forward Support), 429th Light Support Battalion, in Lynchburg — attached to 1st Battalion, 116th Infantry Regiment
        - Company D (Forward Support), 429th Light Support Battalion, in Winchester — attached to 3rd Battalion, 116th Infantry Regiment
        - Company E (Forward Support), 429th Light Support Battalion, in London (KY) — attached to 1st Battalion, 149th Infantry Regiment (Kentucky Army National Guard)
        - Company F (Forward Support), 429th Light Support Battalion, in Norfolk — attached to 1st Battalion, 111th Field Artillery Regiment
    - 29th Division Artillery, in Richmond
      - Headquarters and Headquarters Battery, 29th Division Artillery, at Richmond
    - 29th Combat Aviation Brigade, at Weide Army Airfield (MD) — (Maryland Army National Guard)
      - 2nd Battalion (Assault), 224th Aviation Regiment, at Richmond Airport
        - Headquarters and Headquarters Company, 2nd Battalion (Assault), 224th Aviation Regiment, at Richmond Airport
          - Detachment 1, Headquarters and Headquarters Company, 2nd Battalion (Assault), 224th Aviation Regiment, at Weide Army Airfield (MD) — (Maryland Army National Guard)
        - Company A, 2nd Battalion (Assault), 224th Aviation Regiment, at Richmond Airport (UH-60M Black Hawk)
        - Company B, 2nd Battalion (Assault), 224th Aviation Regiment, at Richmond Airport (UH-60M Black Hawk)
        - Company C, 2nd Battalion (Assault), 224th Aviation Regiment, at Weide Army Airfield (MD) (UH-60M Black Hawk) — (Maryland Army National Guard)
        - Company D (AVUM), 2nd Battalion (Assault), 224th Aviation Regiment, at Richmond Airport
          - Detachment 1, Company D (AVUM), 2nd Battalion (Assault), 224th Aviation Regiment, at Weide Army Airfield (MD) — (Maryland Army National Guard)
        - Company E (Forward Support), 2nd Battalion (Assault), 224th Aviation Regiment, at Richmond Airport
          - Detachment 1, Company E (Forward Support), 2nd Battalion (Assault), 224th Aviation Regiment, at Weide Army Airfield (MD) — (Maryland Army National Guard)
        - Detachment 1, Company A, 2nd Battalion (Security & Support), 151st Aviation Regiment, at Chesterfield County Airport
        - Detachment 2, Company C (MEDEVAC), 1st Battalion (General Support Aviation), 169th Aviation Regiment, at Chesterfield County Airport
          - Detachment 5, Company D (AVUM), 1st Battalion (General Support Aviation), 169th Aviation Regiment, at Chesterfield County Airport
          - Detachment 5, Company E (Forward Support), 1st Battalion (General Support Aviation), 169th Aviation Regiment, at Chesterfield County Airport
        - Detachment 1, Company C, 2nd Battalion (Fixed Wing), 245th Aviation Regiment (Detachment 26, Operational Support Airlift Activity), at Richmond Airport (C-12 Huron)
        - Detachment 2, Company B (AVIM), 248th Aviation Support Battalion, at Richmond Airport
    - 29th Division Sustainment Brigade, in Greensboro (NC) — (North Carolina Army National Guard)
    - 226th Maneuver Enhancement Brigade, in Mobile (AL) — (Alabama Army National Guard)
  - 329th Regional Support Group, in Virginia Beach
    - Headquarters and Headquarters Company, 329th Regional Support Group, in Virginia Beach
    - 276th Engineer Battalion, in Petersburg
      - Headquarters and Headquarters Company, 276th Engineer Battalion, in Petersburg
      - Forward Support Company, 276th Engineer Battalion, in Petersburg
      - 157th Engineer Platoon (Quarry), at Fort Pickett
      - 180th Engineer Company (Engineer Support Company), in Powhatan
      - 229th Military Police Company (Combat Support), in Hanover
      - 237th Engineer Company (Sapper), in West Point
      - 576th Engineer Detachment (Utilities), in Virginia Beach
      - 1033rd Engineer Company (Engineer Support Company), in Cedar Bluff
        - Detachment 1, 1033rd Engineer Company (Engineer Support Company), in Gate City
    - 529th Combat Sustainment Support Battalion, in Virginia Beach
      - Headquarters and Headquarters Company, 529th Combat Sustainment Support Battalion, in Virginia Beach
      - 1173rd Transportation Company (Composite Truck Company), in Virginia Beach
      - 3647th Ordnance Company (Support Maintenance), in Blackstone
    - 1030th Transportation Battalion (Motor), in Gate City
      - Headquarters and Headquarters Detachment, 1030th Transportation Battalion (Motor), in Gate City
      - 229th Chemical Company, in Troutville
      - 1032nd Transportation Company (Medium Truck) (Cargo), in Gate City
      - 1710th Transportation Company (Medium Truck) (Cargo), in Emporia
        - Detachment 1, 1710th Transportation Company (Medium Truck) (Cargo), in Martinsville
  - 91st Cyber Brigade, in Bowling Green
    - Headquarters and Headquarters Company, 91st Cyber Brigade, in Bowling Green
    - Information Operations Support Center, in Fairfax
    - 123rd Cyber Protection Battalion, in Fairfax
      - Headquarters and Headquarters Company, 123rd Cyber Protection Battalion, in Fairfax
      - 133rd Cyber Security Company, in Fairfax
      - 143rd Cyber Warfare Company, in Fairfax
    - 124th Cyber Protection Battalion, in Fairfax
      - Headquarters and Headquarters Company, 124th Cyber Protection Battalion, in Fairfax
      - 134th Cyber Security Company, in Fairfax
      - 144th Cyber Warfare Company, in Fairfax
    - 125th Cyber Protection Battalion, at McEntire Joint National Guard Base (SC) — (South Carolina Army National Guard)
    - 126th Cyber Protection Battalion, in Bedford (MA) — (Massachusetts Army National Guard)
    - 127th Cyber Protection Battalion, in Indianapolis (IN) — (Indiana Army National Guard)
  - 183rd Regiment, Regional Training Institute, at Fort Pickett
    - Headquarters and Headquarters Detachment
    - 1st Battalion (Infantry)
    - 2nd Battalion (Transportation)
    - 3rd Battalion (Modular Training)

Aviation unit abbreviations: MEDEVAC — Medical evacuation; AVUM — Aviation Unit Maintenance; AVIM — Aviation Intermediate Maintenance

== Duties ==
National Guard units can be mobilized at any time by presidential order to supplement regular armed forces, and upon declaration of a state of emergency by the governor of the state in which they serve. Unlike Army Reserve members, National Guard members cannot be mobilized individually (except through voluntary transfers and Temporary Duty Assignments TDY), but only as part of their respective units.

=== Active duty callups ===
For much of the final decades of the twentieth century, National Guard personnel typically served "One weekend a month, two weeks a year", with a portion working for the Guard in a full-time capacity. In the first five years of the 21st century, Department of Defense policy was that no Guardsman would be involuntarily activated for a total of more than 24 months (cumulative) in one six-year enlistment period. This policy was due to change on 1 August 2007, with the new policy to state that soldiers will be given 24 months between deployments of no more than 24 months. However, individual states have differing policies. Since 11 September 2001, over 15,700 Virginia Guard personnel have been deployed.

== See also ==
- Virginia Defense Force
- Virginia Military Institute
