= 276th Engineer Battalion (United States) =

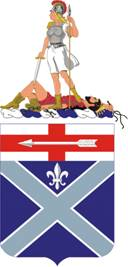
- Coat of arms
- Active: Founded 1652; active 1791
- Country: United States
- Branch: United States Army
- Type: Engineer
- Size: Regiment
- Motto: "Liberty or Death"

Commanders
- Notable commanders: Charles L. Southward (as 176th Regimental Combat Team)

Insignia
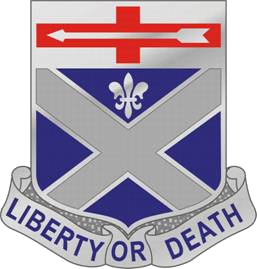
- Distinctive unit insignia

The 276th Engineer Battalion ("First Virginia") is an engineer battalion of the Virginia Army National Guard. Headquartered in Petersburg, Virginia, it is one of several Army National Guard units with campaign credit for the War of 1812.

== History ==
=== Origins ===
The 276th traces its lineage back to the Richmond City Regiment, organized at Richmond in May 1791 from existing elements in the Virginia Militia. On 31 December of that year it was reorganized and redesignated as the 19th Regiment. During the War of 1812, it remained in state service, forming the First Corps d'Elite Brigade of Virginia Militia under the command of Colonel Thomas Mann Randolph for Federal service. The brigade was mustered into Federal service in 1813 with the Richmond Volunteers, the Flying Artillery under Captain William Wirt, the Rifle Company under Captain William H. Richardson, and the Richmond Light Infantry Blues. It mustered out in 1814 at the end of the war.

Elements of the 19th Regiment were mustered into Federal service between 14 and 16 December 1846 as part of the 1st Regiment of Virginia Volunteers during the Mexican–American War. They mustered out of Federal service at Fort Monroe between 1 and 2 August 1848. Meanwhile, on 31 March of that year, the 19th was reorganized and redesignated as the 19th (Richmond City) Regiment. On 1 May 1851, it was consolidated with the 179th (Richmond, organized 1848), 23d (Chesterfield County, organized in 1791), and 33d (Henrico County, organized 1791) Regiments to become the Richmond-based 1st Regiment, Virginia Volunteers.

On the outbreak of the American Civil War, the regiment was mustered into state service on 21 April 1861. On 1 July, it was reorganized and redesignated as the 1st Virginia Infantry and mustered into the Confederate States Army at Manassas. The 1st Virginia served through the war and surrendered at Appomattox on 9 April 1865.

On 25 October 1871, the regiment was reconstituted in the Virginia Volunteers as the 1st Regiment of Infantry, headquartered at Richmond. Companies A, B, and C of the 1st Regiment were mustered into Federal service as Companies M, B, and I of the 2d Virginia Volunteer Infantry, respectively, during the Spanish–American War. Company F was mustered into Federal service on 20 May as Company M of the 3d Virginia Volunteer Infantry. The companies assigned to the 2d Virginia mustered out in December 1898, preceded by Company M of the 3d Virginia on 5 November. The 1st Regiment of Infantry was disbanded on 29 April 1899.

The companies formerly part of the 1st Regiment were assigned to the 70th Infantry Regiment, Virginia Volunteers on 10 October 1900. On 1 September 1908, the regiment was reconstituted in the Virginia Volunteers as the 1st Infantry. On 3 June 1916, the Virginia Volunteers became the Virginia National Guard. On 18 June, due to increased tensions on the Mexico–United States border, the regiment was called into Federal service. It mustered in on 30 June, serving in Brownsville, Texas, and was mustered out upon return to Virginia at Richmond on 16 January 1917.

After the United States' entry into World War I, the 1st Virginia Infantry was called into federal service on 25 July 1917, mustered into Federal service between 25 July and 4 August, and drafted into federal service on 5 August. Sent to Camp McClellan, Alabama, the 1st Virginia consolidated with the 2nd and 4th Virginia Infantry Regiments to form the 116th Infantry Regiment of the 29th Infantry Division on 4 October.

=== Interwar period ===
The 116th Infantry arrived at the port of Newport News on 22 May 1919 on the troopship USS Matsonia and was demobilized 30 May 1919 at Camp Lee, Virginia. Some of the former elements were reorganized as the 1st Provisional Infantry, Virginia National Guard, on 30 December 1919. It was later redesignated as the 1st Infantry, Virginia National Guard, on 7 September 1920 with the regimental headquarters concurrently organized and federally recognized at Richmond. The regiment was redesignated the 183rd Infantry on 9 March 1922 and assigned to the 29th Division, and redesignated the 1st Infantry on 22 February 1929. Company C was awarded the William Randolph Hearst National Marksmanship Trophy in 1937. The regiment conducted annual summer training most years at the state military reservation at Virginia Beach, Virginia, from 1921 to 1939. The regiment was again redesignated the 176th Infantry on 1 January 1941.

=== World War II ===
On 3 February 1941, the 176th was inducted into federal service at Richmond, simultaneously with the rest of the 29th Division, moving to Fort Meade on 17 February. After the Attack on Pearl Harbor resulted in the United States entry into World War II, the regiment was detached to guard Washington, D.C. as part of the Washington Provisional Brigade on 17 December. It was relieved from the 29th Division on 11 March 1942, coming under the control of GHQ. During this period, it served as the White House Honor Guard and the Presidential Special Guard while also guarding the Capitol, other government buildings, and the Combined Chiefs of Staff. The 176th was additionally responsible for ceremonial and escort functions in the capital, and provided guards for scattered key facilities in the Capital area. On 20 February 1943, the regiment was relocated to the A.P. Hill Military Reservation, where it was assigned to the Replacement and School Command on 1 April. The 176th was further relocated to Fort Benning, arriving on 11 April, for duty as School Troops, before being inactivated there on 10 July 1944.

== Lineage ==
Called into Federal service 18 June 1916; mustered into Federal service 30 June 1916 at Richmond; mustered out of Federal service 16 January 1917 at Richmond

- Called into Federal service 25 July 1917; mustered into Federal service 25 July-4 August 1917 at home stations; drafted into Federal service 5 August 1917
- Consolidated 4 October 1917 with the 2d (organized 3 November 1741) and 4th (organized 29 August 1882) Infantry to form the 116th Infantry, an element of the 29th Division
- Demobilized 30 May 1919 at Camp Lee, Virginia
- Former 1st Infantry reorganized 30 December 1919 in the Virginia National Guard as the 1st Provisional Infantry Regiment with headquarters at Richmond
- Reorganized and redesignated 7 September 1920 as the 2d Battalion, 1st Infantry, with headquarters at Petersburg (1st and 3d Battalions – hereafter separate lineages)
- Reorganized and redesignated 9 March 1922 as the 2d Battalion, 183d Infantry
- (183d Infantry assigned in 1923 to the 29th Division)
- Reorganized and redesignated 22 February 1929 as the 2d Battalion, 1st Infantry, an element of the 29th Division
- Reorganized and redesignated 1 January 1941 as the 2d Battalion, 176th Infantry, an element of the 29th Infantry Division
- Inducted into Federal service 3 February 1941 at home stations
- (176th Infantry relieved 11 March 1942 from assignment to the 29th Infantry Division; assigned 1 April 1943 to the Replacement and School Command at Fort Benning, Georgia as the Infantry Demonstration Regiment)
- Inactivated 10 July 1944 at Fort Benning, Georgia
- Reorganized and Federally recognized 20 November 1946 at Richmond as the 3d Battalion, 176th Infantry
- Reorganized and redesignated 1 June 1959 as elements of the 1st Battle Group, 176th Infantry, with headquarters at Richmond
- Converted and redesignated 22 March 1963 as the 276th Engineer Battalion with headquarters at Richmond
- Ordered into active Federal service 18 December 2003 at home stations; released from active Federal service 15 June 2005 and reverted to state control
- Subordinate units (180th Engineer Support Company, 1033rd Engineer Support Company, and Forward Support Company) ordered into State Active Duty on 31 May 2020 under Task Force Red Dragon in response to widespread civil disturbance across Virginia caused by the murder of George Floyd at the hands of Derek Chauvin in Minneapolis, Minnesota
- Ordered into active Federal Service under Title 32 502(f) on 6 January 2021 and stationed in Washington D.C. in response to the 2021 attack on the United States Capitol

== Distinctive unit insignia ==
- Description

A Silver color metal and enamel device 1 inch (2.54 cm) in height consisting of a shield blazoned: Azure, a saltire Gray fimbriated Argent, to chief a fleur-de-lis of the like; on a chief of the last a cross Gules charged with an arrow fesswise of the third. Attached below the shield a Silver scroll inscribed "LIBERTY OR DEATH" in Blue letters.

- Symbolism

The shield is blue for Infantry. The gray saltire commemorates service in the Confederate States Army during the Civil War. The fleur-de-lis symbolizes the service in France during World War I. The red cross (the cross of St. George) refers to the settlement of Virginia by the English and with the arrow alludes to the French and Indian War and participation as colonial militia. The red cross also refers to the Revolutionary service of the unit's predecessor.

- Background

The distinctive unit insignia was originally approved for the 1st Infantry Regiment on 7 June 1929. It was redesignated for the 176th Infantry Regiment on 3 March 1941. The insignia was redesignated for the 276th Engineer Battalion, Virginia Army National Guard and amended to change the symbolism on 29 January 1968.

== Coat of arms ==
- Blazon
  - Shield-Azure, a saltire Gray fimbriated Argent, to chief a fleur-de-lis of the like; on a chief of the last a cross Gules with an arrow fesswise of the third.
  - Crest-That for the regiments and separate battalions of the Virginia Army National Guard: From a wreath Argent and Azure, "Virtus, the genius of the Commonwealth, dressed as an Amazon, resting on a spear with one hand and holding a sword in the other; and treading on Tyranny, represented by a man prostrate, a crown falling from his head, a broken chain in his left hand and a scourge in his right," all Proper. Motto LIBERTY OR DEATH.
- Symbolism
  - Shield-The shield is blue for Infantry. The gray saltire commemorates service in the Confederate States Army during the Civil War. The fleur-de-lis symbolizes the service in France during World War I. The red cross (the cross of St. George) refers to the settlement of Virginia by the English and with the arrow alludes to the French and Indian War and participation as colonial militia. The red cross also refers to the Revolutionary service of the unit's predecessor.
  - Crest-The crest is that of the Virginia Army National Guard.
- Background-The coat of arms was originally approved for the 1st Infantry Regiment on 11 May 1929. It was redesignated for the 176th Infantry Regiment on 4 March 1941. The insignia was redesignated for the 276th Engineer Battalion, Virginia Army National Guard and amended to change the symbolism on 29 January 1968.

== Campaign streamers ==
War of 1812

- Virginia 1814

Mexican War

- Streamer without inscription

Civil War (Confederate service)

- First Manassas
- Peninsula
- Second Manassas
- Sharpsburg
- Fredericksburg
- Gettysburg
- Cold Harbor
- Petersburg
- Appomattox
- Virginia 1861
- Virginia 1863
- Virginia 1864
- North Carolina 1863
- North Carolina 1864

World War I

- Meuse-Argonne
- Alsace 1918

War on Terrorism

- Campaigns to be determined

== Decorations ==
- Valorous Unit Award, Streamer embroidered NINEVEH PROVINCE 2005
- Meritorious Unit Commendation (Army), Streamer embroidered IRAQ 2004

Valorous Unit Award, streamer embroidered Afghanistan 2009
