= 183rd Cavalry Regiment =

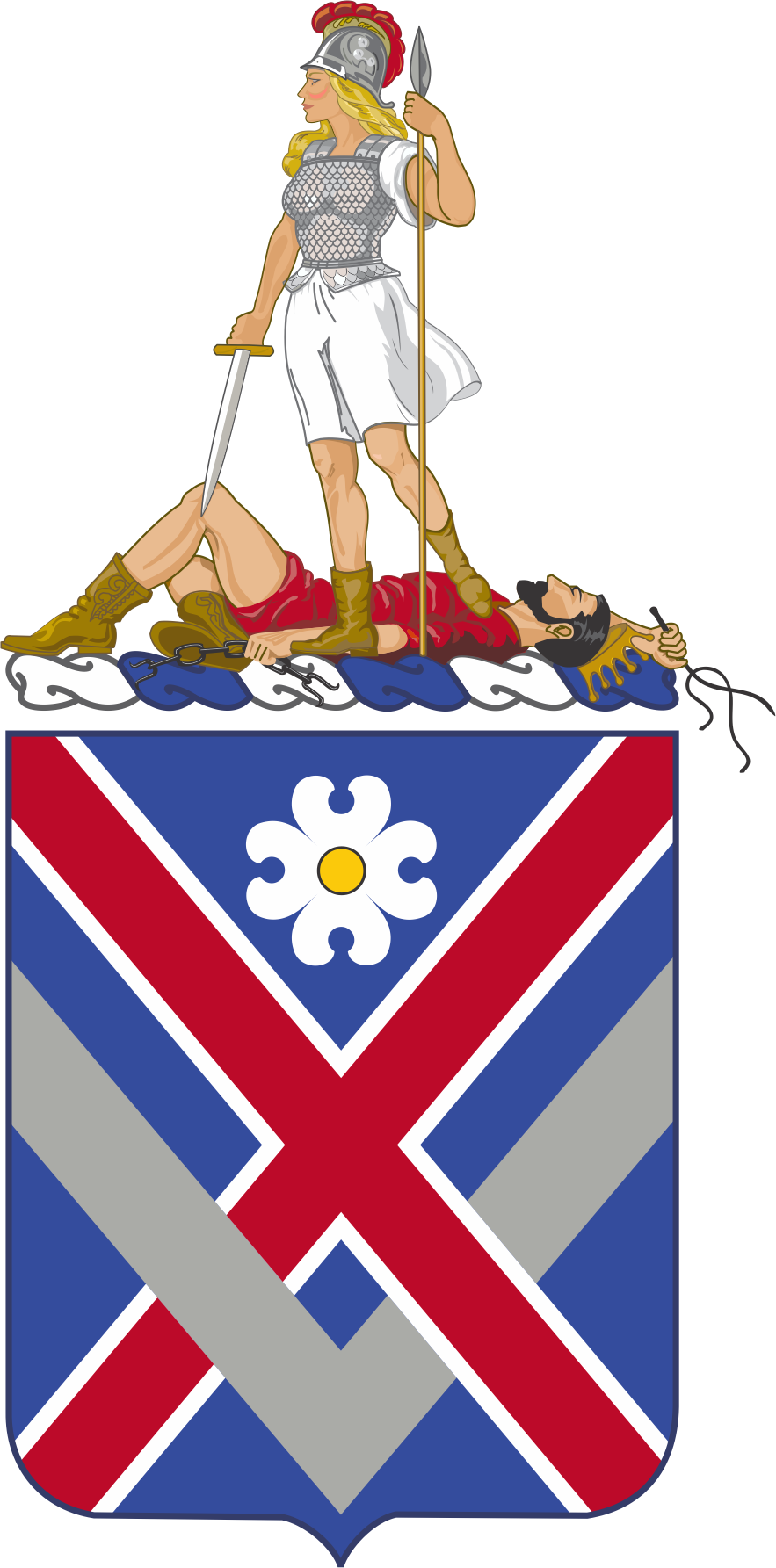
- Coat of arms
- Active: 1920-1944, 1959-1968, 1986-2005, 2006-2026
- Country: United States
- Allegiance: Virginia
- Branch: United States Army National Guard
- Role: RSTA
- Size: Squadron
- Garrison/HQ: Virginia Beach
- Motto: Death to Tyrants
- Colors: Blue, red, and gray.
- Equipment: Humvee

Insignia
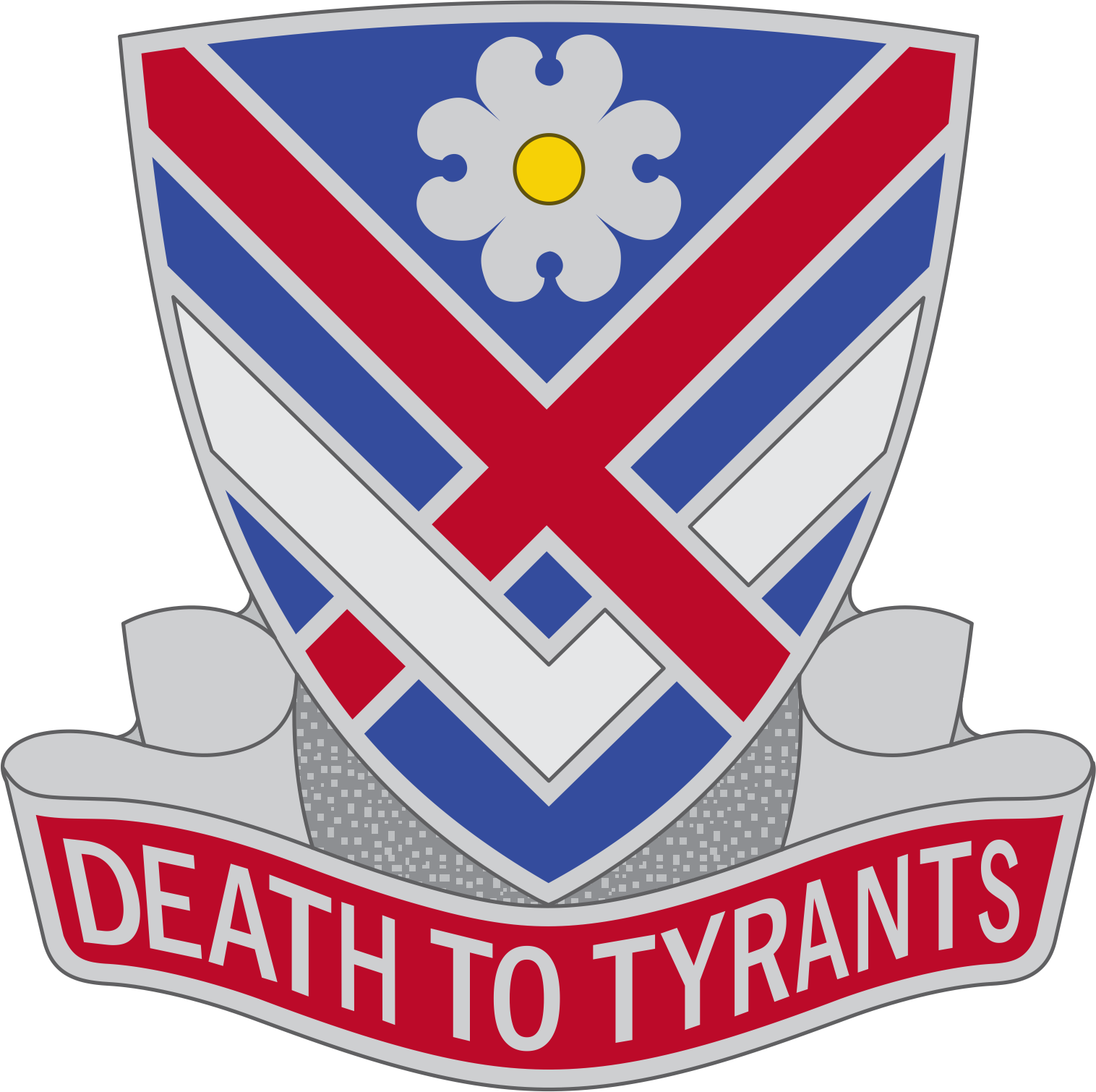
- Distinctive unit insignia

The 183rd Cavalry Regiment was a cavalry regiment of the United States Army, represented in the Virginia Army National Guard by 2nd Squadron, 183rd Cavalry (2-183). The squadron was the reconnaissance, surveillance, and target acquisition squadron of the 116th Infantry Brigade Combat Team, part of the 29th Infantry Division.

The 183rd Cavalry was established as the 183rd Infantry Regiment and was reflagged as a cavalry regiment in 2006.

The 183rd was headquartered in Portsmouth, Virginia and its constituent troops were located across the Hampton Roads area.

Headquarters and Headquarters Troop, 2nd Battalion, 183rd Cavalry was one of several Army National Guard units with campaign credit for the War of 1812.

== History ==
183rd Cavalry in Virginia

=== Early years ===
The 183d Infantry Regiment was activated in 1920 following the end of World War I. As elements of the 116th Infantry Regiment. It arrived at the port of Newport News on 22 May 1919 on the USS Matsonia and was demobilized on 30 May 1919 at Camp Lee, Virginia. It was organized on 30 December 1919 as the 1st Provisional Infantry Regiment, Virginia National Guard, and redesignated the 1st Infantry Regiment, Virginia National Guard, on 7 September 1920. It was redesignated the 183d Infantry Regiment on 9 March 1922 and assigned to the 29th Division. On 22 February 1929, it was again redesignated the 1st Infantry Regiment. It was a part of the 91st Infantry Brigade (later redesignated the 88th Infantry Brigade) in the Virginia National Guard alongside the 116th Infantry Regiment.

=== World War II ===
The regiment participated in training maneuvers with the Virginia Guard until the United States became involved in World War II. On 1 January 1941, it was redesignated the 176th Infantry Regiment. After serving as a separate regiment in the continental United States during the war, it was inactivated in 1944 and provided men to various other units.

=== Postwar service ===
After the war, the 183rd designation returned to the force structure in 1959 under the Pentomic reorganization when the 1st Reconnaissance Squadron, 183d Armor, was activated as the 29th Infantry Division's reconnaissance squadron. The 1963 reorganization of the army resulted in the reorganization of the squadron as the 1st Squadron, 183rd Cavalry, continuing its reconnaissance mission. The squadron incorporated Troop D (Air) from the Maryland Army National Guard. The squadron was eliminated in 1968 together with the 29th Infantry Division. In 1986, when the 29th Infantry Division was reactivated, the 1st Battalion, 183rd Infantry was activated as part of the 2nd Brigade of the division. During the post-Cold War reduction of the Army National Guard, the 1st Battalion, 183rd Infantry was inactivated together with the 2nd Brigade of the 29th Infantry Division and the lineage of the Richmond Light Infantry Blues perpetuated by the 276th Engineer Battalion.

=== War on Terror ===
The 2d Squadron, 183d Cavalry Regiment was activated on 11 February 2006, reflagged from 3rd Battalion, 111th Air Defense Artillery, and absorbed most of 2d Bn 116th Infantry. It was assigned to the 116th Infantry Brigade Combat Team of the 29th Infantry Division. The new squadron was given the mission of providing reconnaissance, surveillance, and target acquisition (or RSTA) for the brigade, and acted as the "eyes and ears" of brigade's commander. From September 2007 to May 2008, the squadron conducted security operations in Kuwait and Southern Iraq in support of Operation Iraqi Freedom. In August 2011, the 2-183d Cavalry deployed to Iraq again where it conducted convoy security operations under the name of Task Force 183. With 825 members, this was the largest deployment of Virginia National Guard soldiers since World War II. The unit returned home in December 2011.

The 183d Infantry Regiment also became the 183d Regiment during the reorganization, and facilitates the Virginia Army National Guard's RTI (Regional Training Institute) at Fort Barfoot (formerly Fort Pickett), Virginia. Colonel James A. Zollar became commander of the RTI in June 2016.

In December 2021, Bravo Troop deployed to the Horn of Africa to support Operation Enduring Freedom-HOA for 9 months. In the HOA, the troop conducted security force operations in two separate locations. Bravo Troop returned to Virginia in September after 9 months of federal active duty.

=== Transformation in Contact and Deactivation ===
Following the restructure of the 116th Infantry Brigade Combat Team into a Mobile Brigade Combat Team as part of the Army's Transformation in Contact initiative, which saw the removal of the organic Cavalry Squadron from the task organizations of former IBCTs, 2nd Squadron 183rd Cavalry regiment conducted its final spur ride and a casing of the colors in August of 2026 at Fort Pickett, VA.

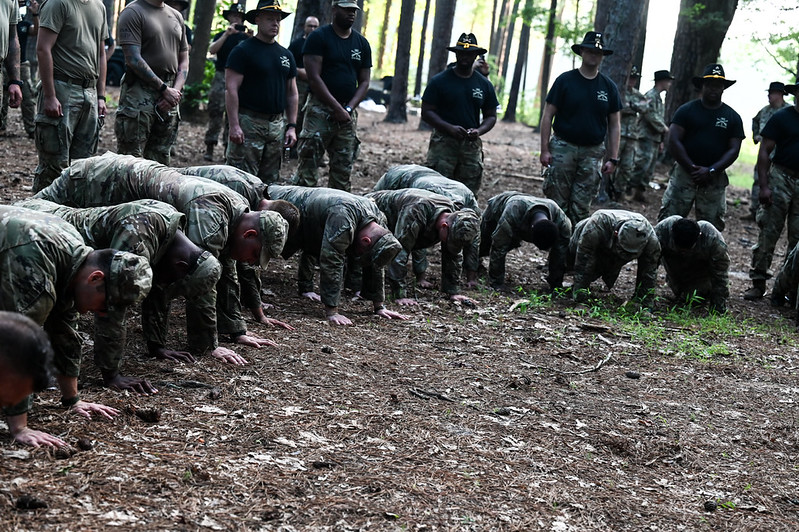
"Shavetails" affiliated with the 2nd Squadron 183rd Cavalry Regiment about to receive their spurs following the completion of the unit's final spur ride in August of 2026.

== Former Structure ==
2nd Squadron, 183rd Cavalry Regiment

- Headquarters and Headquarters Troop; Portsmouth
- A Troop; Virginia Beach, Virginia
- B Troop; Suffolk
- C Troop; Virginia Beach
- D Company, 429th Brigade Support Battalion; Franklin
  - Detachment 1; Franklin

183rd Regiment (Regional Training Institute)

- 1st Battalion; Fort Barfoot
- 2nd Battalion; Fort Barfoot
- 3rd Battalion; Fort Barfoot
