= Fort Pickett =

US Army post near Blackstone, VA

- Blackstone, Virginia
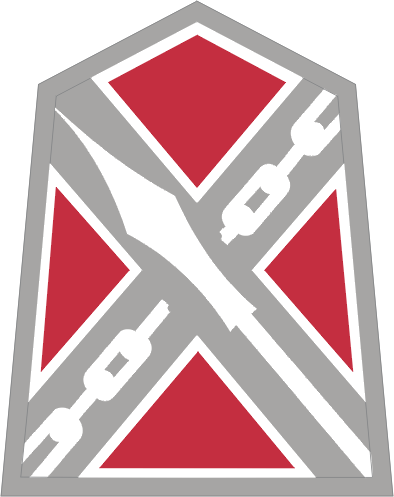
- Shoulder sleeve insignia of the Virginia Army National Guard

Site information
- Type: National Guard Training Site
- Controlled by: Virginia National Guard

Location
- Coordinates: 37°03′12″N 77°56′57″W

Site history
- Built: 1942
- In use: 1941–present

Garrison information
- Garrison: Army National Guard Maneuver Training Center

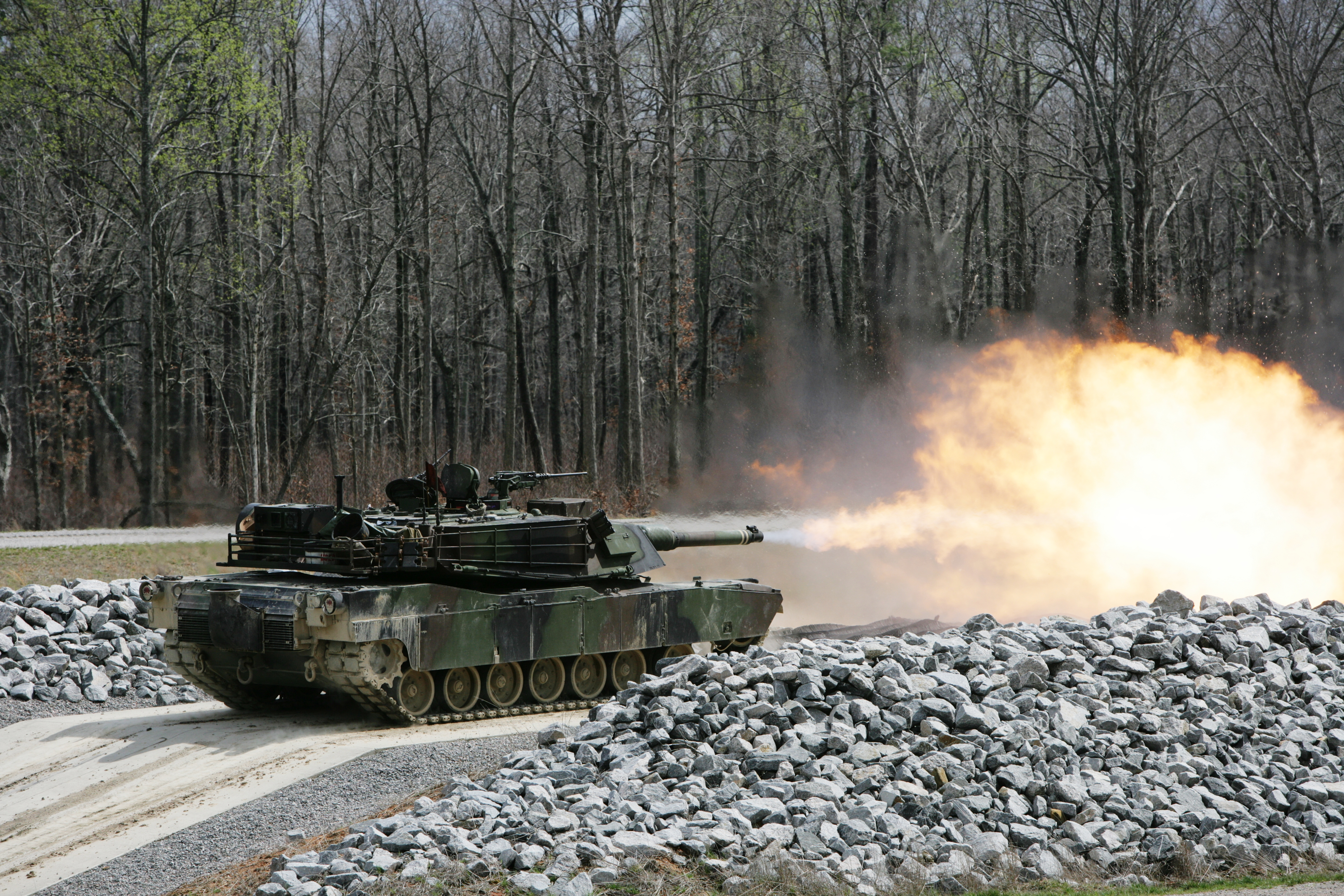
M1A1 Abrams firing at a Fort Pickett range, 2008.

Fort Pickett, formerly Fort Barfoot, is a Virginia Army National Guard installation, located near the town of Blackstone, Virginia. Home of the Army National Guard Maneuver Training Center, Fort Pickett was originally named for the United States Army officer and Confederate General George Pickett. It was one of the U.S. Army installations named for Confederate soldiers that has been renamed by the Naming Commission. Their recommendation was for the post to be renamed Fort Barfoot, in honor of Medal of Honor recipient Colonel Van T. Barfoot. On 5 January 2023, William A. LaPlante, under secretary of defense for acquisition and sustainment, directed the full implementation of the recommendations of the Naming Commission, DoD-wide. The redesignation ceremony occurred on 24 March 2023. In June 2025, President Trump announced plans to revert the base's name to Fort Pickett, but that it would now honor Vernon W. Pickett, a decorated WWII soldier. The redesignation took effect on 13 June 2025.

== Beginnings ==
Late in 1941 a team of Army surveyors visited the site of a former Civilian Conservation Corps camp near the small rural town of Blackstone, Virginia. There they found enough land, water and other resources needed to establish a post large enough to simultaneously train more than one infantry division. The site also offered easy railroad access to both mountain and coastal training sites. By December 1941, 45,867 acres (185.62 km^{2}) of land in Nottoway, Dinwiddie, Lunenburg and Brunswick Counties were acquired and cleared to prepare for construction of the first buildings.

== World War II ==
Two rail spurs were built into the camp between 1942 and 1943 to increase logistical efficiency and the rapid movement of troops on and off post. Air transportation to and from Pickett became available with the completion of a Blackstone Army Airfield in late 1942. The tower was placed beside the only hangar built on post, and its steel beam frames and cinder block foundation are still visible today. Since each concrete runway was 5,269 feet long and 300 feet wide, the four-runway airfield was large enough to allow the safe landing of the Douglas C-47 "Gooney Bird." Fighter planes could use the runway in an emergency, although none were stationed at the airfield. Aircraft fuel was delivered by rail and contained in fuel trucks, since permanent storage tanks were not constructed until after World War II. The airfield remained virtually unchanged until the 1990s.

By the end of 1942, more than 1,400 buildings were completed and in use across the post, including approximately 1,000 enlisted barracks and 70 officer's quarters. Twelve chapels, the post hospital complex (later greatly expanded) and six firehouses were built, along with warehouses, headquarters and administrative buildings. To assure an adequate water supply for the post and its potential 60,000-soldier population, the Army built and maintained its own water pumping, filtration and sewage treatment plants. In the 1980s the Army transferred control and operation of these facilities to the town of Blackstone.

For recreation, there were four movie theaters (two more were added later), a field house with a gym, several enlisted clubs, a main post exchange and several "satellite" PXs. By the war's end, more than 300 additional buildings were constructed, including a female barracks and facilities for two prisoner-of-war camps.

== Cold War and beyond ==
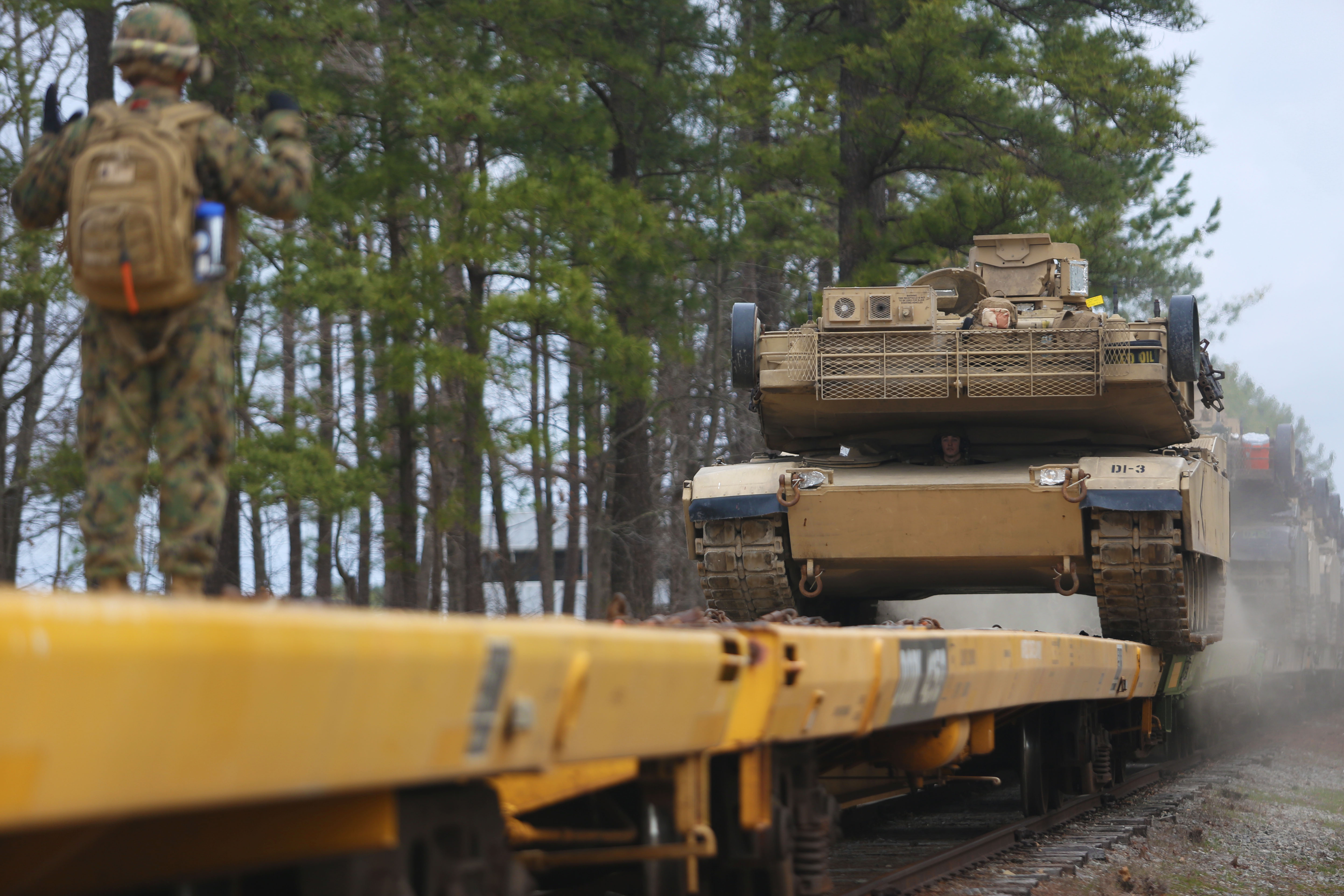
Marines unload M1A1 Abrams tanks at Fort Pickett in preparation of field training.

Although Camp Pickett seemed destined to once again be closed after the conclusion of the war, the demands of the Cold War and the need to train division-sized reserve component units in the mid-Atlantic region brought a redefined role for the post. In 1950 the 43rd Infantry Division, a national guard division from New England, was activated and sent to Camp Pickett for additional training. In 1951 this division was sent to Germany as part of the Army of Occupation. In 1960, portions of Camp Pickett were being revamped to house battalions coming for a week or two each year to conduct specialized training. This included not only Guard/Reserve commands, but also Navy and Marine Corps personnel. These components still use Pickett's facilities today under Virginia National Guard control.

The predecessor to the Virginia National Guard Maneuver Training Center was organized and stationed at Pickett in 1961. Its primary mission, then as now, was to store and maintain pieces of equipment such as tanks and other armored vehicles that visiting units could use, rather than incurring the high cost of bringing their own machines from home station.

Pickett experienced two significant interrelated events in 1974. The first was its redesignation from "Camp" to "Fort Pickett" as a reflection of its new mission to offer training opportunities, not only to Reserve units, but also active duty forces on a yearly basis. The second important event was the completion of the first new building on the post since the Korean War. Building 467 contained space to house enlisted personnel, a mess facility, and administrative offices. It was built of brick.

Ten years later, a new complex of barracks and support structures was completed. Large enough to house an entire brigade, the complex was dedicated 8 June 1984, in memory of Tech. Sgt. Frank D. Peregory of the 116th Infantry, forty years to the day after he earned the Medal of Honor during the D-Day invasion. Other upgrades of facilities included a doubling of the existing telephone system from 2,600 to 5,100 lines in 1991 and renovation and extension of the Blackstone Army Airfield's runways in 1994 to allow use by C-130 and C-17 transport aircraft. This permitted easy access for air-lifted troops and equipment coming to Fort Pickett for training.

In more recent years, other structures were added or converted to meet the post's changing missions. Among these were a new firehouse and renovations on the remaining NCO Club, making it more of a community center where local town events as well as post functions are held. Good community relations have always been important to the success of Fort Pickett. From its very beginning, the post has dramatically changed the lives of the citizens of Blackstone. It has created a number of good jobs and supported the town in a variety of other ways, from hosting elderly fishing trips at the on-post lakes to Fourth of July celebrations. Boy and Girl Scouts organizations also have camped, fished and hiked the nature trails for many years. Currently, many activities attract a large number of local citizens and former staff and personnel who had been stationed there during the war.

Fort Pickett is also the home of an annual exercise with elements of 36 Canadian Brigade Group, 37 Canadian Brigade, as well as elements of the US Military. Previously home to Canadian Forces Exercises Southbound Trooper and Maritime Raider, it is now home to Exercise Maroon Raider. This is an annual readiness exercise that provides realistic combined arms combat training for Regular and Reserve Army forces. Maroon Raider training scenarios includes day and night live-fire, combat maneuvers, combined arms, and other battlefield tactics to build a ready and capable force to deploy internationally.

While the facilities at Pickett are geared to train military personnel and units, non-military organizations use them too. These include the U.S. Department of State, the United States Marshals Service, the Virginia Defense Force, FBI, ATF, the Virginia Wing of the Civil Air Patrol, Virginia State Police, and local law enforcement agencies.

The decision to inactivate the regular Army garrison at Fort Pickett and turn over operation of the post to the Virginia National Guard was finalized in 1995 and enacted in 1997. Since that time no regular Army personnel have been assigned to Pickett.

The 183rd Regiment maintains the Virginia RTI at Fort Pickett.

== See also ==
- List of U.S. Army installations named for Confederate soldiers
