= 116th Infantry Regiment (United States) =

Regiment of the Virginia Army National Guard

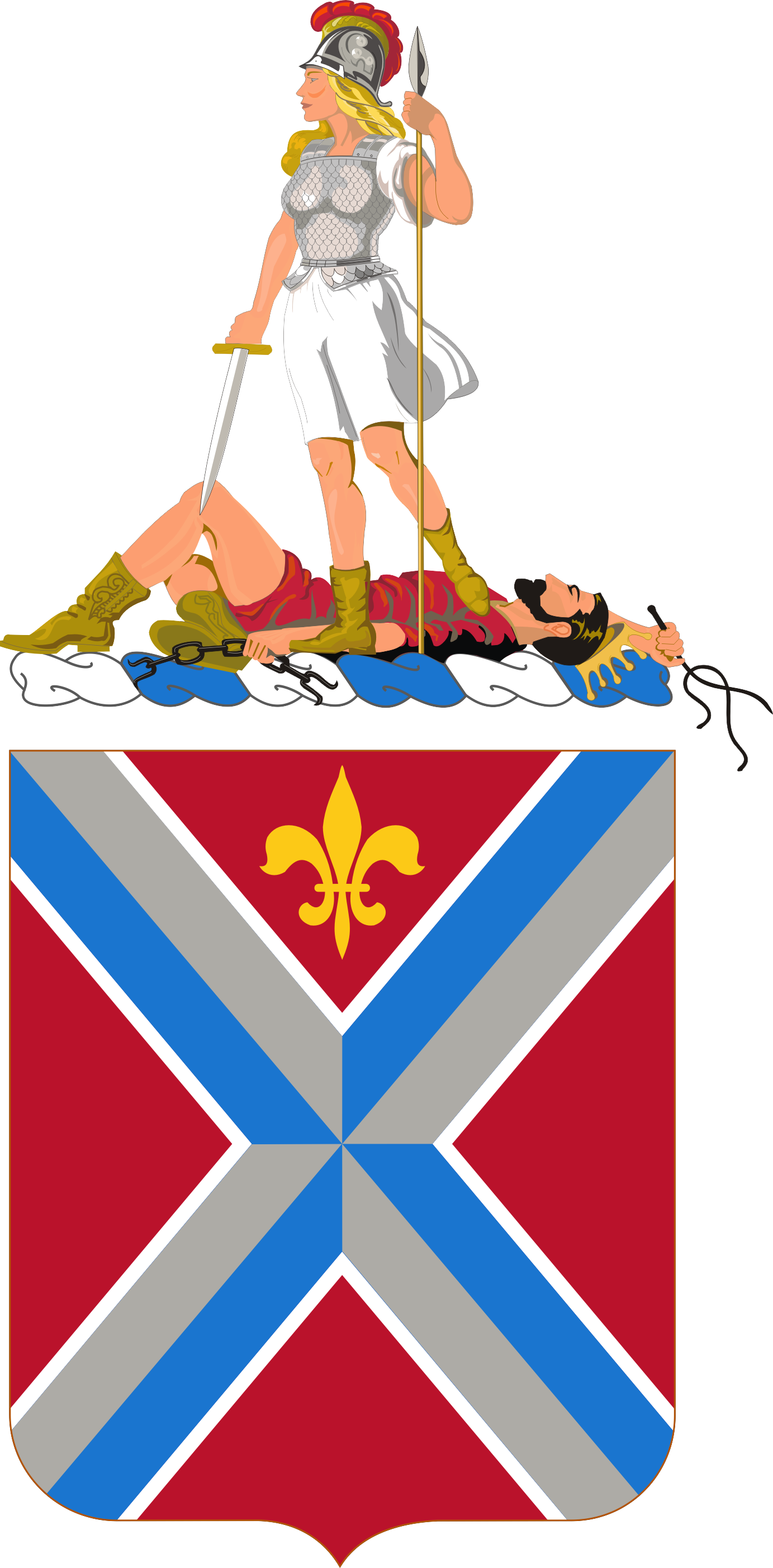
- Coat of arms
- Founded: 1741
- Country: United States
- Branch: United States Army
- Type: Infantry
- Size: Regiment
- Motto: "Ever Forward"
- Engagements: French and Indian War American Revolution: Battle of Cowpens; Battle of Guilford Court House; Siege of Yorktown; War of 1812; Mexican–American War; American Civil War: Manassas Campaign; Campaigns of the Army of Northern Virginia; Spanish–American War; World War I: Meuse-Argonne Offensive; World War II: Omaha Beach; Battle of Saint-Lô; Battle for Brest; Operation Queen; Global War on Terrorism: Operation Iraqi Freedom; Operation Enduring Freedom; Operation New Dawn; Operation Spartan Shield

Commanders
- Notable commanders: Charles D. W. Canham; Sidney V. Bingham Jr.

Insignia
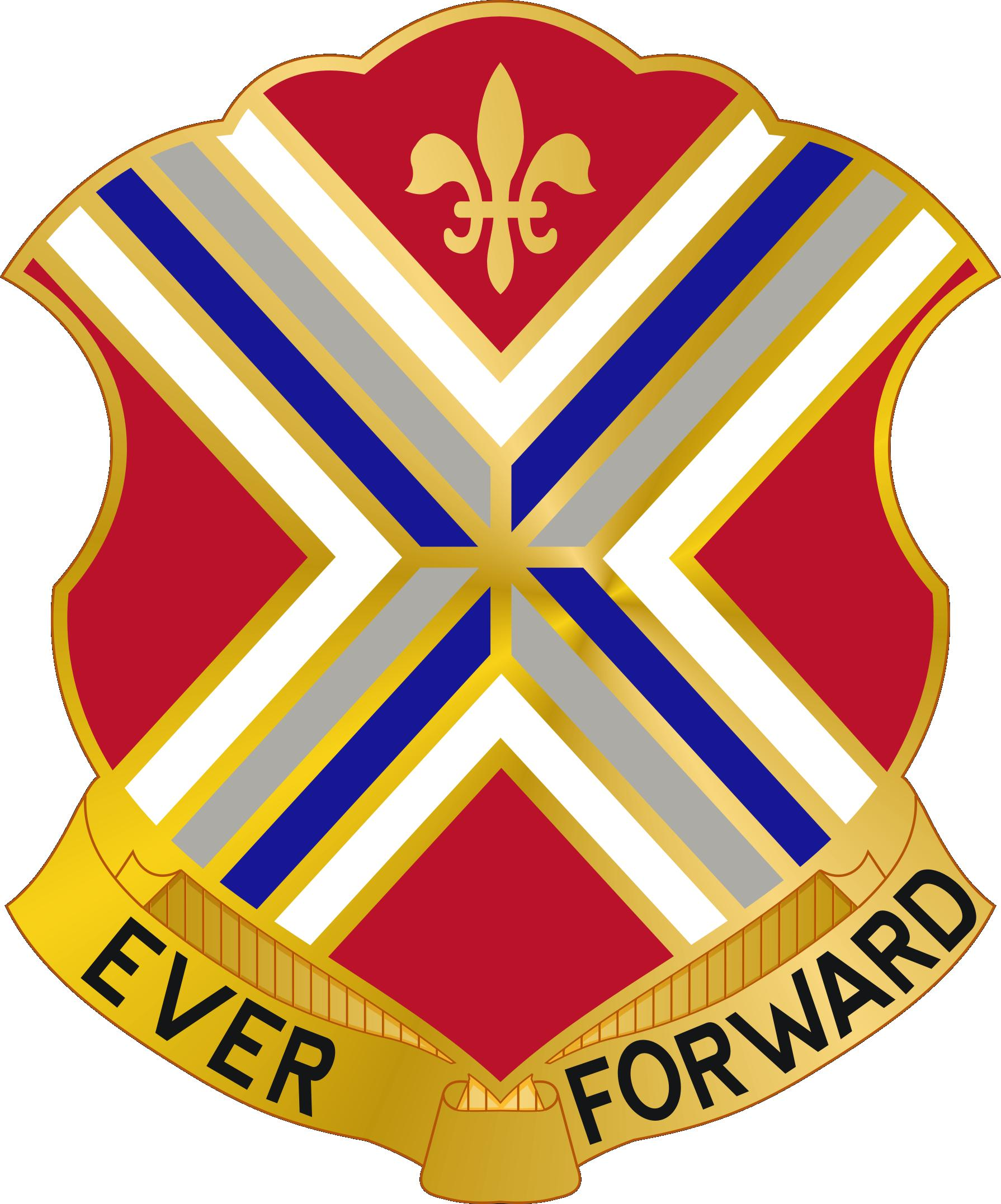
- Distinctive unit insignia

The 116th Infantry Regiment is an infantry regiment in the Virginia Army National Guard.

The regiment was formed as part of the Virginia Militia. It is one of several National Guard units with colonial roots. Units in its lineage included the Confederate Stonewall Brigade of the Army of Northern Virginia. It was formed under the designation of the 116th during World War I, when previously existing Virginia National Guard units were consolidated in federal service. It fought in the Meuse-Argonne Offensive with the 29th Infantry Division and returned to the United States in 1919, where it was demobilized. It was reformed in 1922 and called back into federal service before the American entry into World War II in March 1941. It fought in the Normandy landings, on Omaha Beach, where it suffered heavy casualties. It served continuously with the 29th Infantry Division in its eastward advance until reaching the Elbe at the end of World War II in Europe.

The regiment was inactivated in 1946 and was reformed in 1948. It was reorganized as part of the Combat Arms Regimental System in 1959, during which it became a parent regiment. Its battalions became part of the 116th Infantry Brigade in 1975. Units of the brigade have since been called into federal service for duty in Kosovo Force, for the Iraq War, and for the War in Afghanistan.

== History ==
=== Virginia Militia ===
The regiment traces its heritage to the Augusta County Regiment of the Virginia Militia, organized on 3 November 1741 at Beverley's Mill Place, which later became Staunton. Elements of the regiment were called up during the French and Indian War and Dunmore's War. The regiment provided a company, organized on 18 March 1754 and commanded by Captain Andrew Lewis, to the Virginia Regiment. Organized between 11 and 25 August 1755, companies of the regiment led by William Preston, David Lewis, and John Smith became part of the Rangers.

During the American Revolutionary War, elements of the regiment were called up for active service. Captain William Fontaines's company became part of the 2nd Virginia Regiment and was organized on 21 October 1775. Captain John Hayse's company became part of the 9th Virginia Regiment and was organized on 16 March 1776. Captain David Stephenson's company became part of the 8th Virginia Regiment. Captains David Laird and John Syme's companies were organized on 3 December, becoming part of the 10th Virginia Regiment.

On 31 December 1792, the regiment was expanded to form the 32nd and 93rd Regiments. Elements of 32nd and 93rd were called up during the War of 1812. Around 1839, the two regiments became the 32nd, 93rd, and 160th Regiments. Parts of the 32nd and 160th were called up during the Mexican–American War on 6 January 1847 as the Light Infantry Company of the 1st Regiment of the Virginia (alternately the Augusta) Volunteers at Richmond. The regiment mustered out at Fort Monroe on 27 July 1848.

=== Civil War 1861-1865 ===
On 13 April 1861, volunteer companies of the 32nd, 93rd, and 160th Regiments became the 5th Regiment, Virginia Volunteers. They mustered into Confederate service on 1 July 1861 as the 5th Virginia Infantry, part of the Army of the Shenandoah's 1st Brigade, which later became the Stonewall Brigade. The remainder of the three regiments became the 52nd Virginia Infantry after being mustered on 1 May 1862. The 5th and 52nd Virginia Infantry surrendered with the Army of Northern Virginia at Appomattox Court House on 9 April 1865. The successor 116th Infantry Regiment later received battle honors for the engagements that these Civil War units participated in; thus the regiment carries campaign streamers earned in fighting for the Confederacy.

=== After the Civil War ===
Former troops of the 5th and 52nd Infantry became independent infantry companies in the Shenandoah between 1871 and 1881. These units were part of the Virginia Volunteers. On 2 May 1881, the companies became the 2nd Regiment of Infantry at Staunton. Headquarters moved to Harrisonburg on 22 April 1886. The regiment was disbanded on 2 April 1887 and broken up into independent infantry companies again. On 20 April 1889, these became the 2nd Regiment of Infantry again, now with headquarters at Winchester. The headquarters moved to Woodstock on 15 June 1893.

During the Spanish–American War, the regiment was merged with parts of the 1st Regiment of Infantry. It was called up between 10 and 21 May 1898 and designated the 2nd Virginia Volunteer Infantry, under the command of Colonel James C. Baker. On 2 June, the regiment began its movement to Jacksonville, Florida, where it became part of the Seventh Army Corps at Camp Cuba Libre when it arrived on 3 June. The regiment, along with the 4th Virginia and the 49th Iowa, became part of the Third Brigade of the corps' Second Division. On 12 August, the Protocol of Peace was signed, ending the combat phase of the war. The Second Virginia was ordered to be mustered out, and on 19 September left its temporary camp at Pablo Beach for home stations. The regiment reached Richmond during 20–21 September, where they received a thirty-day leave on 23 September. At the end of the thirty days the regiment's companies were assembled and mustered out at home stations between 13 and 20 December of that year, with a strength of 46 officers and 1,146 enlisted men. The regiment was disbanded on 29 April 1899 and reorganized from then until 1902 as separate infantry companies. On 19 May 1905, it merged with separate infantry companies formerly part of the disbanded 3rd Regiment of Infantry, which was another regiment that had been formed in 1881 in central Virginia and called up for the Spanish–American War, to become the 72nd Infantry with headquarters at Luray. On 1 September 1908, it became the 2nd Infantry (Virginia Volunteers).

The regiment became part of the Virginia National Guard on 3 June 1916. The regiment was called up on 30 June at Camp Stuart as a result of US–Mexican tensions on the border. It was sent by train to Brownsville, Texas, on 6 July, arriving on 11 July. In late July, the regiment's machine gun company was formed. The regiment became part of the 1st Provisional Brigade there in early August. On 10 January 1917, the regiment became part of the 2nd Separate Brigade after the command structure of National Guard units in the Brownsville District was reorganized. The regiment departed Brownsville by train after several delays on 11 February. On 16 February, it arrived in Richmond. The regiment mustered out on 28 February 1917 at Richmond.

=== World War I 1917-1918 ===
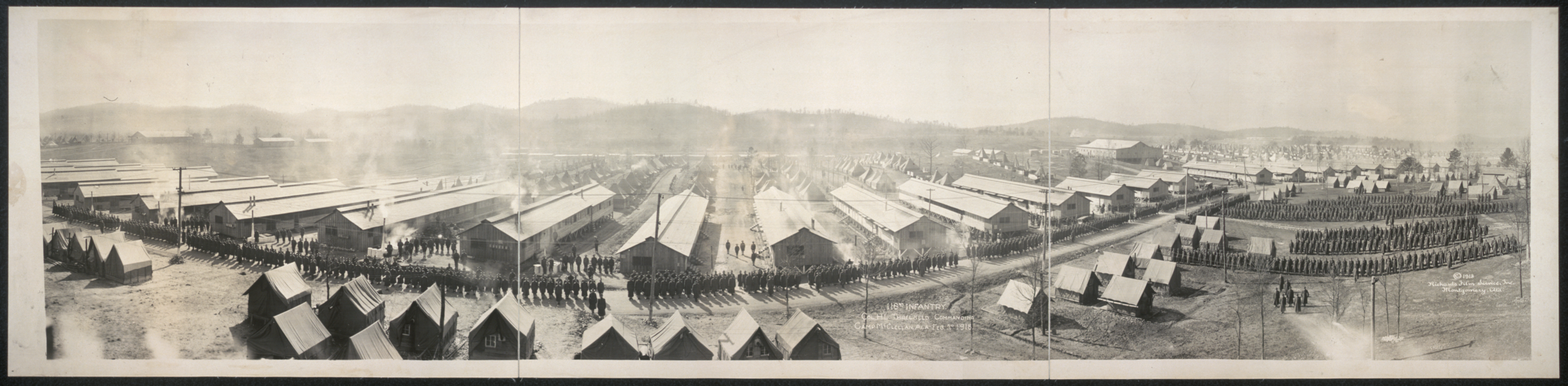
A panoramic photograph of the regiment at Camp McClellan, February 1918

On 25 March 1917, the regiment was called up just before the United States entered World War I, which it did the following month. The regiment was mustered in between 25 March and 3 April. The regiment guarded bridges and railroads in Virginia. The regiment was drafted on 5 August and a month later departed by train for Camp McClellan, Alabama, arriving there on the evening of 6 September. On 4 October, the 2nd Virginia consolidated with the 1st and 4th Virginia Infantry Regiments. The new regiment became the 116th Infantry, part of the 29th Infantry Division, then at Camp McClellan, Alabama. It served as part of the division's 58th Infantry Brigade alongside the 112th Machine-Gun Battalion and the 115th Infantry Regiment. Colonel Robert F. Leedy of the 2nd Virginia became commander of the new regiment, which included 105 officers and 3,686 enlisted men. Colonel Hansford L. Threlkeld took command on 1 January. He was replaced by Colonel William J. Perry of the 1st Virginia on 1 May. On 5 June, Lieutenant Colonel Hobart M. Brown took command. Brown led the regiment until it reached France.

The regiment conducted training in shooting, gas warfare, and using the bayonet for the next months until 11 June 1918, when it began movement to Hoboken. On 15 June the regiment embarked for France on the USS Finland from there. On 27 June the regiment disembarked at Saint-Nazaire, where it stayed for three days in a former British camp. It moved to Argillières, where additional training was planned. However, due to German pressure on the Allied front, the regiment was moved in early July to Auxelles-Bas. Threlkeld took command of the regiment around this time. In August, it transferred to La Chapelle, Bréchaumont, and Reppe. The regiment occupied trenches in the Haute-Marne sector of Alsace. On 21 August, Colonel A.J. Harris replaced Threlkeld. On 26 August, the 2nd Battalion was attacked by German troops supported by a heavy artillery barrage at 0430. The German troops were repulsed after two hours of fighting, most of which was conducted by Company F. In early September, the regiment moved to Offemont, near Belfort, and then to Hargeville and Souhesmele-Grande. Around 1 October, it camped in the Bois Bouchet as a part of the First Army's reserve.

The regiment fought in the Meuse-Argonne Offensive with the 29th Division. The regiment was attached to the French 18th Infantry Division. The 3rd Battalion was positioned on the southern slope of the ridge southeast of Côte des Roches, and the 1st Battalion was along the Canal de l'Est, south of the Samogneux–Brabant road. The regiment's 2nd Battalion was in reserve 1,500 meters northeast of Neuville. During the night of 7 to 8 October, the regiment's battalions moved into the starting positions. The attack began at 0500 on 8 October, with the 3rd Battalion advancing with its right on Ravin d'Haumont. After encountering scant resistance, it reached the immediate objective in four and a half hours. The 1st Battalion then attempted to move through the 3rd, but was checked by machine-gun fire from the Bois de Brabant-sur-Meuse. At 1400 the 1st was able to advance through the 3rd and both battalions continued into the forest. Advancing against machine guns, high-caliber artillery, anti-tank guns, and gas, they reached the normal objective at 1540 and stopped at the Ravin de Molleville (at the southern edge of Molleville Farm) on the right and the ridge in Boissois Bois on the left, but withdrew to the ridge in the Bois de Brabant-sur-Meuse, overlooking the Ravin de Bourvaux. The two battalions had contact with the French on the right, but none with the 115th Regiment to the left. Headquarters Company Sergeant Earle Gregory received the Medal of Honor for his actions in singlehandedly capturing 19 German soldiers on 8 October.

At 0500 on 9 October, German troops counterattacked the 116th and the 115th's extreme right, but were repulsed. The 1st Battalion renewed the attack and advanced 1 kilometre (0.62 miles) into the Molleville Forest by 1130. On 10 October, parts of 1st Battalion were relieved by the 113th Infantry Regiment's 2nd Battalion. 1st Battalion then extended its line to link up with the 115th Regiment. During the night division commander Charles Gould Morton relieved Harris of command and replaced him with division machine gun officer Lieutenant Colonel Reginald H. Kelley. The next day the regiment resumed the attack, with 1st Battalion being checked while moving towards Molleville Farm. The battalion was unable to cross a clearing and made two further attempts, which were also repulsed with heavy losses. On 15 October the 3rd Battalion attacked again, advancing in the lead of the regiment. By 1600 they reached the southern edge of the Bois de la Grande Montagne after taking Molleville Farm. The 2nd Battalion reinforced the 3rd there, and established a line near the Étraye–Consenvoye road. 1st Battalion attacked in the lead on 16 October, and along with the 115th's 2nd Battalion had formed a line from the reverse slope of Hill 370 to the road junction area near Molleville Farm in the Bois de la Grande Montagne by 1630. The division had reached its objectives and formed defensive positions along the line. From 8 to 22 October, the regiment suffered casualties of 838 wounded, 44 died of wounds, and 152 killed.

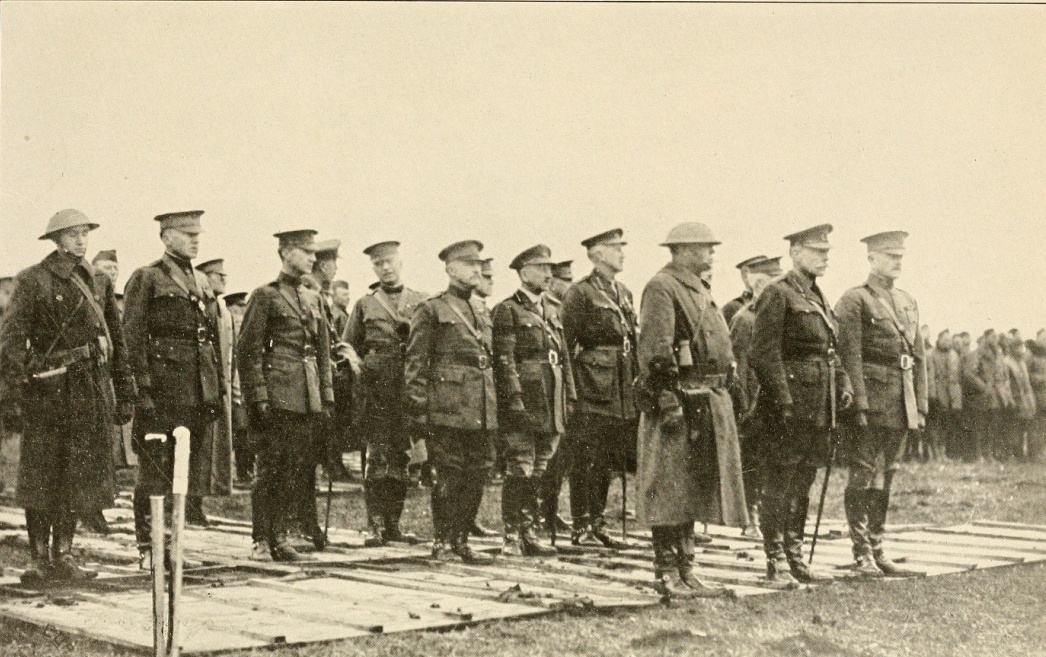
Haig reviewing the regiment, April 1919

On 23 October, the 2nd Battalion attacked towards Hill 361 with the 115th's 1st Battalion and the 113th's 1st Battalion. The battalion advanced in the center after an artillery barrage and stopped at 1430 after reaching Hill 361. The 1st and 3rd Battalions of the 116th then moved into the line. On the night of 28 to 29 October, the regiment was relieved by the 79th Infantry Division's 316th Infantry Regiment. From 23 October, the regiment had suffered casualties of 161 wounded, 15 died of wounds, and 46 killed. Total casualties of the regiment in the offensive were thus 1,005 wounded, 59 died of wounds, and 198 killed. During the offensive, the regiment captured 2,000 German prisoners, 250 machine guns, and 29 high-caliber guns. The regiment moved with the division to Vavincourt. The war ended on 11 November, and the regiment and the division moved to the 11th (Bourbonne-les-Bains) Training Area. For the next several months the regiment conducted training. Kelley was relieved of duty after being gassed on 4 December and replaced by Colonel George W. Ball. The regiment was reviewed as part of a ceremony where American personnel were decorated by Field Marshal Sir Douglas Haig, Commander-in-Chief (C-in-C) of the British Expeditionary Force (BEF), on 4 April 1919 at Chaumont. On 11 April the regiment moved with the division to the Ballon area of the Le Mans American Embarkation Center. Ten days later, it was transferred to Saint-Nazaire. On 10 May, the regiment embarked for the United States on the USS Matsonia. After returning to Newport News on 21 May, the regiment was demobilized on 30 May 1919 at Camp Lee.

=== Interwar ===
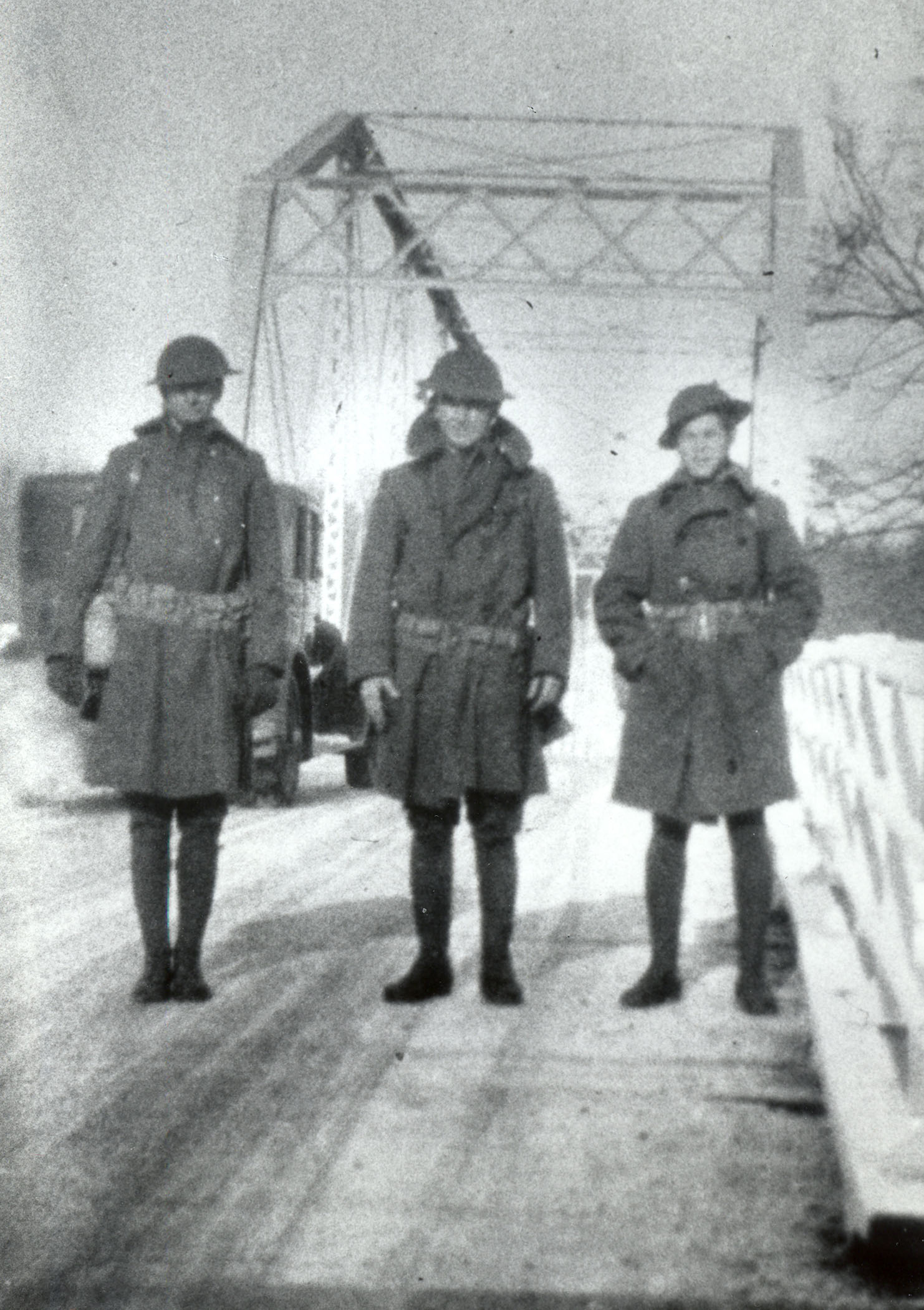
Members of Company G, 2nd Battalion, 116th Infantry, known as the Farmville Guard, guarding a bridge on the outskirts of Danville in the winter of 1930–1931.

On 12 October 1921, former units of the regiment located in western Virginia became the 2nd Infantry in the Virginia National Guard. The regiment was redesignated on 9 March 1922 as the 116th Infantry and assigned to the 29th Division (later redesignated as the 29th Infantry Division). Its headquarters was federally recognized 3 April 1922 at Staunton. During the interwar period, the 116th conducted annual summer training at Virginia Beach between 1921 and 1938. Between November 1930 and January 1931, the regiment restored order during a strike of cotton mill workers in Danville. The location of headquarters was changed on 26 June 1933 to Lynchburg. In August 1939, the regiment participated in First Army maneuvers at Manassas, which ended on 19 August. In August 1940, the regiment was transported by rail and truck to the First Army maneuvers at Pine Camp, the largest US Army maneuvers held in the interwar period at the time. After the maneuvers, which involved live fire and simulated air attacks, the 116th returned to home stations in the last week of August.

Armories of the regiment in 1941

On 3 February 1941, the regiment was called into federal service and its men reported to their armories for the next ten days. The regiment and the 29th Division were moved to Fort Meade on 13 February after being called into federal service. At this time the regiment absorbed many draftees from Maryland, Pennsylvania, Kentucky, and Tennessee, among other states. The regiment conducted training for the next months. In June, the regiment and the division moved to A.P. Hill Military Reservation for training. From A.P. Hill the 116th and the rest of the division moved south by road to participate in the Carolina Maneuvers near Fort Bragg, reaching camp sites on 27 September. Between 6 and 17 October the 29th Division maneuvered against the 28th Infantry Division, and then as part of II Corps alongside the 28th and 44th Infantry Divisions. In the latter it faced elements of IV Corps and VI Corps. After the maneuvers concluded in late November the 116th returned to Fort Meade with the 29th by road.

=== World War II 1941-1945 ===
The United States entered World War II after the Attack on Pearl Harbor on 7 December 1941. The attack found the 116th traveling north through southern Virginia near the North Carolina border. Upon its return to Fort Meade, the regiment was split up – the main body of the regiment guarded the coastline of the Eastern Shore and a battalion was detached to the coast of the Carolinas. Between 12 and 14 January 1942, it participated in amphibious exercises with elements of the 1st Infantry Division, repelling a simulated invasion at Cape Henry.

On 14 March 1942, at the regiment's farewell dinner, actress Madeleine Carroll was made ceremonial "daughter of the regiment". The regiment trained at Fort A.P. Hill, VA from April to 6 July, when they began exercises in the Carolinas (the second Carolina Maneuvers). On 17 August, the regiment was sent to Camp Blanding in Florida in preparation for deployment. In September the regiment moved by train to Camp Kilmer, NJ, the holding point for American troops being moved to Europe. After arriving on 18 September, the regiment embarked for the United Kingdom aboard the Queen Mary, a passenger liner converted into a troopship, on 26 September, arriving on 5 October. During the voyage, the men of the regiment witnessed the collision of the Queen Mary with the escorting cruiser HMS Curacoa on 2 October. On the next day the Queen Mary docked at Greenock.

In the United Kingdom, the 116th was transported by rail to Tidworth in the southeast, where it continued training. On 11 October, Lieutenant Colonel Morris T. Warner took command of the regiment. On 16 March 1943, Colonel Charles D.W. Canham became the regimental commander. In late May the 116th was transferred along with the division to Devon and Cornwall, relieving the British 55th Infantry Division there to free up Tidworth for the buildup of American forces in England, Operation Bolero. The regiment took over responsibility for coast defense in the Plymouth area. With the addition of the 111th Field Artillery Battalion, it became the 116th Regimental Combat Team (RCT). The 116th participated in intensive training in Dartmoor and Bodmin Moor. In July, it commenced amphibious assault training on landing boats loaned by the British at Slapton Sands. In September the 116th RCT began training at the U.S. Army Assault Training Center on Woolacombe Beach, the first unit of the 29th to go through the center. At the beginning of 1944, the regiment included 166 officers, five warrant officers, and 3,100 enlisted men.

==== D-Day ====
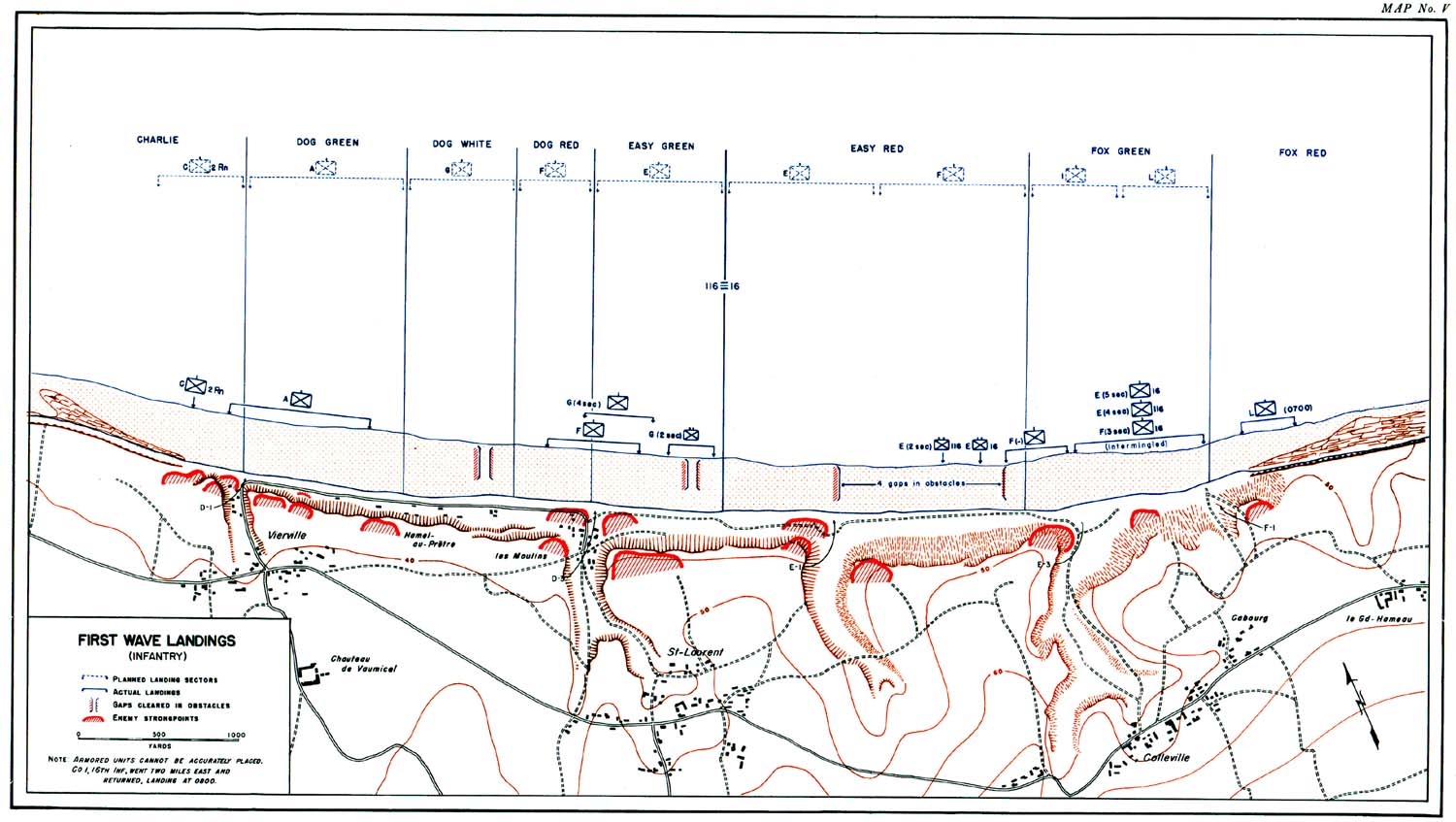
The first wave of the assault on Omaha Beach.

In preparation for the Invasion of Normandy, the regiment participated in invasion rehearsal exercises, using landing craft, vehicle, personnel (LCVP) and landing craft assault (LCA). For the invasion, the regiment was part of Force O, the initial assault force. The regiment was to lead the assault on Omaha Beach to the west of 1st Division's 16th Infantry, and would be temporarily attached to 1st Division. H-Hour, the beginning of the invasion, was scheduled for dawn on 5 June (D-Day, the first day of the assault). Companies A, E, F, and G were to be in the first wave of the assault on Omaha Beach. The beach was divided into sectors: Company A (nicknamed the “Bedford Boys”), the westernmost, was to land at Dog Green, Company G at Dog White, Company F at Dog Red, and Company E at Easy Green on the right of 16th Infantry. It was planned that by 09:30 on D-Day, the beach exits would be open and vehicles able to leave the beach. 1st Battalion was to take Vierville, link up with the ranger group advancing east along the coastal highway, and advance on Vire. Meanwhile, 2nd Battalion would capture Saint-Laurent and the heights southwest of it. 3rd Battalion constituted the reserve, and was tasked with advancing to Longueville.

Between 3 and 8 May, the regiment participated in Exercise Fabius I at Slapton Sands, a final rehearsal before D-Day. On 11 May elements of Force O moved to their assembly areas. The regiment relocated by truck to Blandford Camp on 15 May, where it was confined behind barbed wire in order to preserve secrecy. At Blandford each company was briefed on its missions for the invasion. On 3 June the regiment embarked for Normandy from Weymouth. 1st Battalion (Companies A, B, C, and D) boarded the SS Empire Javelin, 2nd Battalion (Companies E, F, G, and H) the USS Thomas Jefferson, and 3rd Battalion (Companies I, K, L, and M) the USS Charles Carroll.

At 03:10 on 6 June (the invasion had been postponed for 24 hours due to inclement weather), Companies F and G began climbing into their LCVPs. All first wave landing craft had left the ships by 04:30. At 05:00, a naval and aerial bombardment commenced pounding the German defenses, but the aerial bombardment was ineffective and the naval bombardment failed to destroy most of the German gun emplacements, manned by the 352nd Infantry Division. The landing craft approached Vierville at 06:00, and at 06:36 the ramps of Company A's five surviving boats out of six were dropped after reaching the assigned sector. There were no shell holes for cover at Dog Green, and within seven minutes Company A was virtually wiped out by either the heavy German fire or from drowning in the surf – by the end of the day, only 18 of 230 members of the company had avoided becoming casualties.

Company G mainly landed on Dog Red after its boats drifted off course from their assigned sector, Dog White. Smoke from grass fires shielded the three or four sections on Dog Red, who suffered few losses to "sporadic and inaccurate" fire as they moved across the tidal flats. Most of Company G reached the shingle intact ten to fifteen minutes after landing, but other boats suffered heavy casualties farther to the east. F Company mostly landed in its assigned sector, Dog Red, directly in front of the strongly fortified German positions at Les Moulins, and was disorganized due to losses of officers. Company E, assigned to Easy Green, ended up east of Fox Green with E Company of the 16th Infantry.

The second wave began at 07:00, landing in a period of forty minutes. Company B waded ashore around 07:26 and suffered heavy casualties, although one of its boat teams took Vierville. By the end of the day Company B had been reduced to 28 men (roughly 85% casualties). The regimental command group landed around 07:30 with assistant division commander Brigadier General Norman Cota and Canham. They rallied the men for the attack and around 08:30 Cota discovered an exit off the beach, through which men began advancing. Company D landed off course, running into heavy German fire. Company H suffered heavy losses to German machine gun firing from Les Moulins. Company K landed around 07:50 and elements of the unit ended up pinned down until midday near the Vierville draw. Company L also landed around this time.

Around 9:00 Company K began advancing inland, breaching the seawall but losing fifteen men in a minefield before reaching the crest around 12:30. 111th Field Artillery's guns were lost in the surf and its artillerymen ended up pinned down in front of Les Moulins like 2nd Battalion after landing between 07:30 and 08:30. Company G advanced up the beach between 08:00 and 09:00, meeting the wounded Canham, who was organizing an attack on Vierville. Around 08:30 he and 50 to 60 men moved up a hill to the right of Hamel; this group later joined up with an element of Company B led by Lieutenant Walter Taylor in the attack on the fortified Chateau at Vierville.

Company H landed at H+30 but suffered heavy losses because the smoke from the grass fires had lifted by that time. After Taylor's group captured the Chateau, they advanced beyond the house but had to pull back to the house when three truckloads of German infantry counterattacked. Company K linked up with 5th Ranger Battalion at 16:00 and advanced into Vierville, encountering only sniper fire. At the end of the day, only 250 men were left from 1st Battalion. Meanwhile, 3rd Battalion and elements of 2nd Battalion held positions northwest of St. Laurent near the 115th Infantry. Company C and Ranger units were west of Vierville, while parts of 1st and 2nd Battalions and the 121st Engineers were half a mile south of Vierville. On 6 June, the regiment suffered 341 casualties, including soldiers from Bedford-based Company A, a community which proportionally had the highest D-Day losses in America. The National D-Day Memorial was erected in Bedford, VA to honor their loss.

On 7 June, 1st Battalion moved back to Pointe du Hoc against stiff German resistance to assist the Rangers in repulsing a German counterattack, digging in there for the rest of the day. On 8 June, 2nd and 3rd Battalions joined the 1st at Pointe du Hoc, and the 116th fought as a unit for the first time in the war. Companies K and L with 3rd Battalion assisted the Rangers in an attack across a bridge on the Aure later in the day. During a move from Les Moulins, 2nd Battalion broke loose from the beach and fought their way to a farmhouse to establish the first command post in France. Towards the end of 8 June, Company K advanced on Grandcamp, during which Technical Sergeant Frank Peregory killed numerous German soldiers and forced others to surrender. He was posthumously awarded the Medal of Honor. After capturing Grandcamp, 2nd and 3rd Battalions mopped up scattered German resistance, while 1st Battalion continued the advance towards Maisy and the coastal battery.

==== Saint-Lô ====
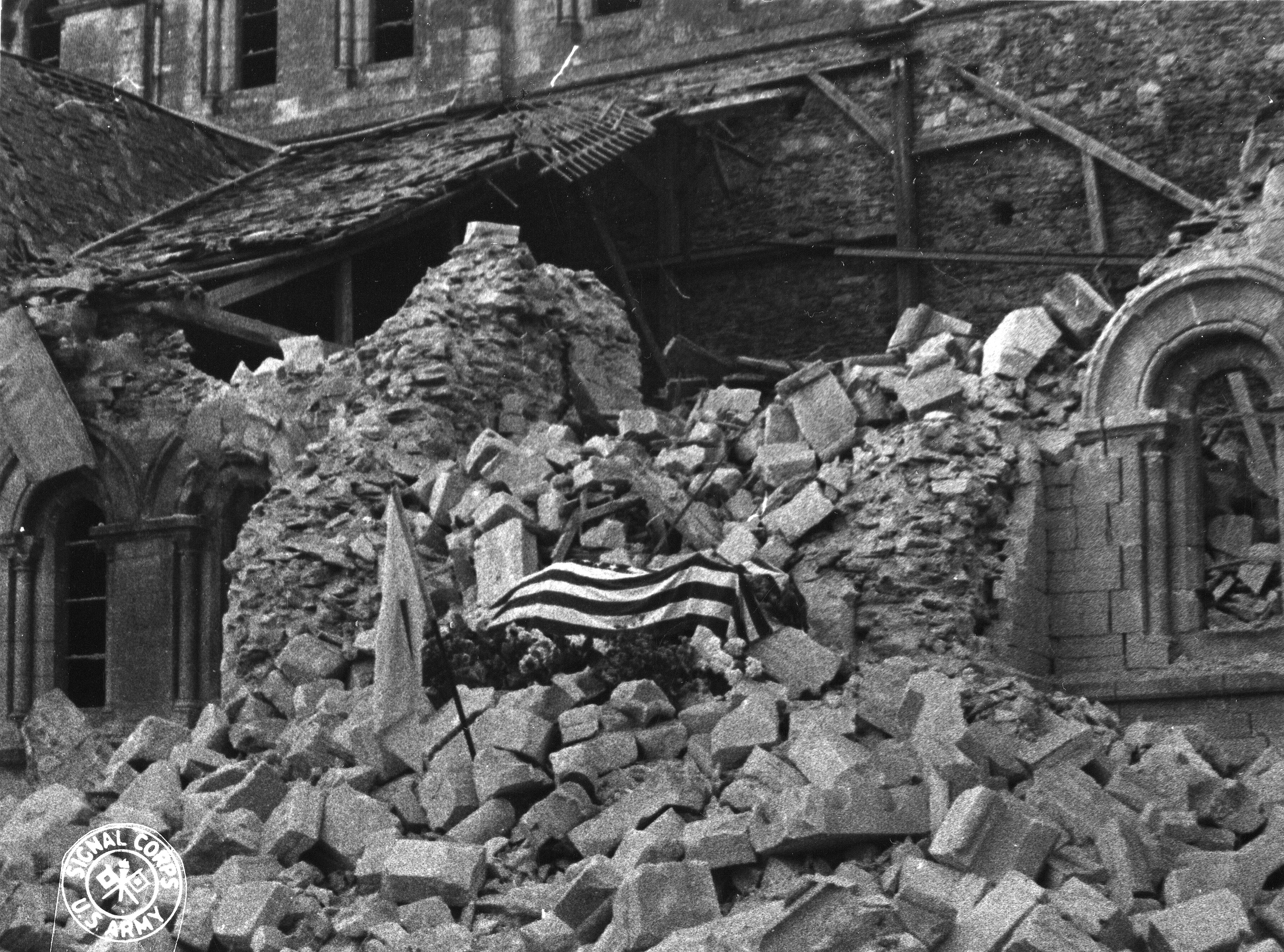
Flag-draped coffin of Major Thomas D. Howie in the rubble of St. Lo cathedral

On 11 June the 116th was withdrawn to the reserve in order to reorganize due to the D-Day losses. After the 115th Infantry was repulsed while attacking across the Ellé towards the key road junction of Saint-Lô, the 116th was moved forward on the morning of 13 June. The regiment began crossing the river at 20:15, encountering heavy small arms fire which died down, allowing the 116th to reach the opposite bank by midnight. The 2nd Battalion captured Saint-Clair, and Couvains was captured at 10:45 on the morning of 14 June. By 17 June, most of the regiment had reached positions only 3 miles (4.8 km) short of Saint-Lô, but the fighting in the Battle of Saint-Lô bogged down in the difficult bocage terrain of Normandy. The 116th fought to overcome Martinville Ridge near the city from 12 July, then after street fighting the city was captured on 18 July. 3rd Battalion commander Major Thomas D. Howie was killed by a mortar shell on 17 July just before he was to lead his unit into the city and moments after telling division commander Major General Charles Gerhardt "See you in St. Lo!". His flag-draped body was brought into the city on the lead jeep during its liberation and was laid in state in the city's square. Between 7 June and 19 July, 438 men of the regiment were killed, 2,040 wounded, and 38 missing, for a total of 2,516 casualties. On 20 July the 29th was relieved by the 35th Infantry Division and sent back into XIX Corps reserve near Saint-Clair.

In reserve, the regiment rested and received replacements. During Operation Cobra, the breakout from Normandy, the regiment fought in the advance on Vire in early August. Its objective was to secure the high ground to the north and northwest of the town. Between 7 and 8 August, 1st Battalion took Hill 203, covering the approaches to the town, which was abandoned by the German defenders in the morning. Following the capture of Vire, the division was pulled back to receive replacements, and the regiment conducted battle drill and small unit training between 16 and 21 August.

==== Brest ====
On 22 August, the regiment moved out by truck for Brest, a strongly fortified German-held port city. The regiment completed its march by the afternoon of 23 August at an assembly area near Ploudalmézeau, 10 miles (16 km) northwest of the city. The 116th, the first to arrive, sent the 3rd Battalion to "a forward assembly area one mile northeast of" Saint-Renan on 24 August. From the forward assembly area, the battalion patrolled the line of departure for the 29th's attack, a southeast-facing line around four miles northwest of the city. For the attack, the 29th was positioned on the right flank of VIII Corps. The regiment moved up to the line of departure on the night of 24–25 August, beginning the attack at 01:00. The 116th advanced south in column of battalions with the 115th Infantry on its left. Its 3rd Battalion initially faced little resistance, and by 04:00, the 1st Battalion was tasked with capturing the high ground at Guilers and Keriolet by attacking on the 3rd Battalion's right. German resistance increased throughout the day, and the regiment dug in for the night. During the next two days, German opposition stiffened further, and the regiment was relieved by the 115th so that it could flank the German positions by using a natural ridgeline towards Brest.

On 28 August, the 116th took positions on the division's right flank, moving forward to Kerguestoc by the evening in column of battalions. It advanced 500 yard the next day, but the fighting bogged down on 30 August. A midnight attack by the 1st and 2nd Battalions took La Trinite on the night of 4–5 September, after which they repulsed a German counterattack on the next day. The regiment's 3rd Battalion was assigned to Task Force Sugar alongside the 5th Rangers and a tank unit, attacking Hill 53 and helping to cut the coastal highway. On the night of 13–14 September, the 116th replaced the 115th in the attack against Fort Montbarey. After the 121st Engineers blew gaps through the minefields surrounding the fort. Company C attacked at dawn and cleared the ground west of the moat in fierce close combat. After the engineers continued clearing the minefield under the cover of a smoke screen, a combined tank and infantry assault was launched at 17:00. Advancing behind flamethrowing Churchill tanks, Company B mopped up German resistance, enabling the 1st Battalion to surround the fort by the end of the day.

Fort Montbarey surrendered on 16 September after the engineers tunneled under the fort and blew parts of it up with explosives. The battalion captured around 75 German soldiers. In house-to-house fighting the regiment advanced into the last German stronghold, Recouvrance, and cleared the area by the end of 17 September. The remaining defenders surrendered on 18 September and the 116th was tasked with policing the division area in Brest before moving out to a rest area on 19 September. However, the regiment's rest was brief, and they moved out by train for the Siegfried Line on 24 September, arriving at Visé in Belgium on 29 September.

==== Siegfried Line ====
On 6 October, the 29th, as part of XIX Corps, was tasked with protecting the corps' left flank, probing the Siegfried Line (a German fortification line on the Franco-German border), and following up the 2nd Armored Division advance at Geilenkirchen. The 116th was positioned on the right flank of the corps, with the 1st Infantry Division on its left and the 3rd Battalion cooperating with the 2nd Armored's Combat Command A (CCA). The 3rd Battalion rode across the Wurm from Rimburg on CCA's tanks, dismounting at Umbach to occupy the town. On the next day the attack continued towards Baesweiler and Oidtweiler, which fell on 8 and 7 October, respectively. Between 1 and 4 October the 1st Battalion was attached to the 30th Infantry Division, defending positions three miles northwest of Aachen. On 4 October the 2nd Battalion was moved up from the reserve to the Kerkrade and Holz area, relieving the 30th's 120th Infantry.

On 13 October, the regiment's 1st and 2nd Battalions were attached to the 30th Division for an attack on Aachen through heavily defended Würselen. Under heavy German artillery and mortar fire, the 116th advanced between 500 and 1,000 yards (460 and 910 m) by the end of the day in street fighting. The attack was resumed the next day, and 2nd Battalion commander Major Charles Cawthon was wounded; he was replaced by Colonel Sidney Bingham. The regiment was withdrawn from the front and returned to the 29th after the capture of Aachen for rest and river crossing training at Brunssum between 23 and 24 October. In early November the division returned to the front, taking positions on the line of Schaufebberg, Oidtweiler, and Baesweiler against Jülich. During the month Dwyer transferred to another unit and was replaced by Lieutenant Colonel Harold A. Cassel.

On 16 November the attack began, with the 116th joining with units from the 2nd Armored to take Setterich on the 29th's left flank. Its 1st Battalion attacked from the south with Companies B and C, but were stopped 400 yards (370 m) short of the town on 17 November by machine gun fire. That night, Company A moved up to the town's western side, while the 2nd Battalion attacked from the southeast. The three-pronged attack with tank support captured the town in street fighting on 18–19 November. The regiment briefly went into reserve at Baesweiler before moving forward to take Ungershausen and Englesdorf on 20 November. It then advanced against Koslar, the last line of defense before Jülich, beginning 21 November. Due to mud and adverse weather conditions Koslar was not taken until 28 November. In early December, Bingham replaced Cassel in command of the regiment. In heavy fighting the regiment cleared the west bank of the Roer River by 9 December. The front then settled down and the regiment trained for the Roer crossing for the next weeks.

==== Advance into the Roer to the end of the war ====
After the German counterattack in the Battle of the Bulge, the 116th took over the 2nd Armored's positions after it left for the fighting. In January the regiment conducted three major raids on German positions on the opposite bank, which kept the German troops "on edge". On 23 February the division launched the attack across the Roer, with the 116th's 3rd Battalion capturing Immerath, and the 2nd Battalion Lutzerath on 27 February. After "pausing to regroup", the regiment continued towards Spenrath and Pesch, with the 1st Battalion taking Otzenrath just before nightfall. These gains brought the 29th Division to Mönchengladbach, and the regiment bypassed the city on the right on 1 March, cutting off the defenders. On 24 March the 1st Battalion took over security at Ninth Army headquarters in the city.At the beginning of April, the regiment went back into combat, attached to the 75th Infantry Division, attacking the Ruhr Pocket. It took up positions on 2 April, and was tasked with crossing the Dortmund–Ems Canal in an attack beginning two days later. Preceded by a half-hour artillery bombardment, the regiment's 1st and 2nd Battalions crossed the canal and captured Waltrop. As German resistance crumbled, it reached the Duisburg–Berlin Autobahn by the end of 5 April. On the next day, the 3rd Battalion flanked the German left, advancing 5,000 yards (4,600 m) and repulsing a German counterattack against Companies E and G with the assistance of American artillery. The regiment then transferred back to the 29th. For the next few days the regiment helped organize Displaced persons camps before moving back into action to mop up the Ruhr Pocket between 18 and 19 April. After overcoming token resistance and accepting German surrenders, the regiment reached the Elbe on 24 April. At the Elbe it met troops of the German 160th Infantry Division, recently transferred from Norway, capturing 1,600 prisoners. On 2 May the division linked up with Soviet troops on the other bank, and Germany surrendered five days later. The regiment suffered casualties of 1,298 killed, 4,769 wounded, and 594 missing for a total of 7,113 during the war. In mid-May the 116th began occupation duty in the Bremerhaven and Wesermünde area in the Bremen enclave.

On 24 December the regiment boarded the transport USS Lejeune, setting sail for New York on Christmas Day. It arrived at New York on 4 January 1946, after which its men were demobilized. On 6 January, the regiment inactivated at Camp Kilmer.

=== Cold War 1947-1991 ===
The regiment was reorganized and federally recognized on 24 March 1948 at Staunton. It became a parent regiment of the Combat Arms Regimental System on 1 June 1959. It included the 1st and 2nd Battle Groups, part of the 29th Division. On 22 March 1963, the battle groups were converted into battalions. On 1 February 1968, a third battalion was added and all three battalions became part of the 28th Infantry Division when the 29th was inactivated. On 1 April 1975, the regiment's battalions became part of the 116th Infantry Brigade of the 28th Division.

=== Post-Cold War Decade 1991-2001 ===
In 1997, the 3rd Battalion's Company C deployed to Bosnia, mostly guarding the Sava River Bridge. This was the first time since the Vietnam War that a National Guard infantry company had been deployed to a combat zone. The company suffered no losses and had no incidents before returning home in May 1998.

=== Global War on Terrorism 2001-Present ===
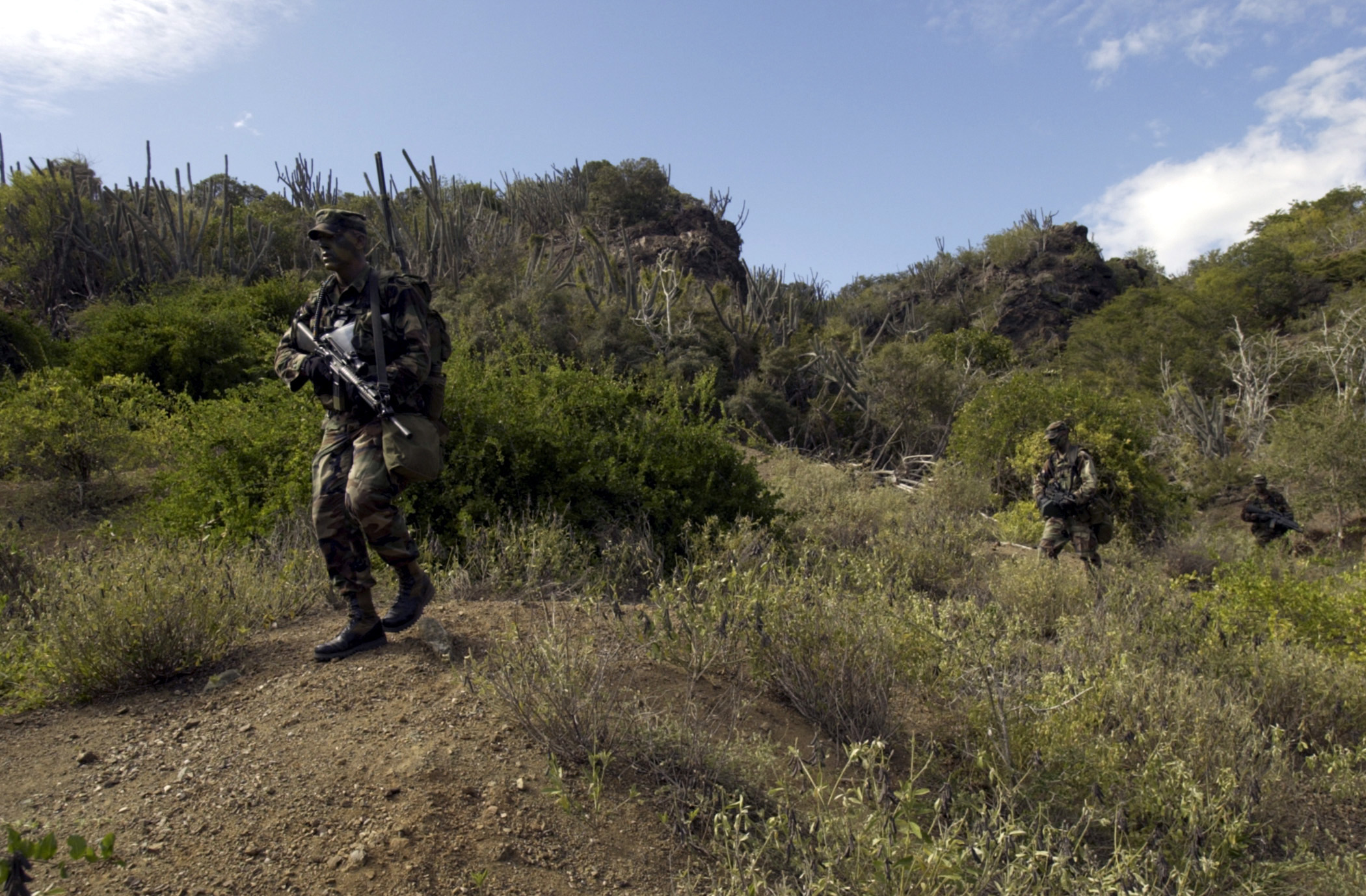
Soldiers of the 2nd Battalion on patrol in Guantanamo, January 2003

On 1 November 2002, the 2nd Battalion, 116th Infantry Regiment was mobilized for deployment to Guantanamo Bay, Cuba to take part in Operation Enduring Freedom. This marked the first mobilization of a battalion of the 29th Infantry Division since World War II. The unit provided security of the base and Camp Delta, the detainee operations camp. The deployment ended in October 2003.

On 1 March 2004, the 3rd Battalion, 116th Infantry Regiment was mobilized for deployment to Afghanistan to take part in Operation Enduring Freedom. Members of the battalion reported to armories around Virginia and began arriving at Bagram Air Field in Afghanistan on 15 July 2004. They were quickly engaged in operations. The battalion conducted combat operations in Ghazni and SECFOR operations at Bagram Airfield. Numerous slice elements were placed under the operational control of the battalion. The newly formed task force assumed the name of the beaches the regiment stormed more than 60 years prior – Normandy. During the deployment two 116th Infantry soldiers were killed by a roadside bomb, the first Virginia National Guard soldiers to die in combat since World War II. The battalion returned to the United States, being released from active duty and reverting to state control on 16 June 2005.

On 1 September 2005, the regiment was reorganized and redesignated as the 116th Infantry, eliminating the 2nd Battalion. It was redesignated as the 116th Infantry Regiment on 1 October.

In August 2006, the 1st Battalion mobilized in support of KFOR as part of the 29th Infantry Division to provide stability operations in the then Serbian province of Kosovo with NATO. The battalion trained at Camp Atterbury for two months, and then deployed to Kosovo on 6 December. They become known as Task Force Red Dragon for the duration of their deployment in Vitina municipality, which ended on 5 November 2007. The 116th returned to Kosovo under the name "Task Force Saint Lo" in February 2022 for KFOR 30. During the rotation the 116th provided support to NATO alongside the 547th Medical Company (Area Support) from Joint Base Lewis-McChord. The tour ended in November 2022.

On 3 February 2007, the 3rd Battalion under the command of LTC John M. Epperly was alerted for deployment in support of Operation Iraqi Freedom. On 23 June the battalion entered active duty as Task Force Normandy. After four months of training at Camp Shelby, the battalion deployed to Iraq and Kuwait in September. A Company provided convoy escort in the area of Fallujah and Ramadi, part of Multinational Division West. B Company provided convoy escort west of the Euphrates and near the Syrian border, also part of Multinational Division West. C Company provided convoy escort around Mosul and Kirkuk in Multinational Division North. Ten soldiers were wounded in the deployment, nine of whom were from C Company. In Kuwait, Headquarters Company and D Company became part of Security Force. D Company guarded Ash Shuaybah and Headquarters Company provided command and control for D Company and the Area Reaction Force for southern Kuwait. The battalion returned to the United States in April 2008 being released from active duty and reverting to state control on 26 July 2008. 3rd Battalion earned the Meritorious Unit Commendation for the deployment as well as campaign credit for the Iraqi Surge Campaign and the Global War on Terror Expeditionary campaign.

The 1st Battalion was ordered into active Federal service on 25 January 2010. From March to August, it deployed to Iraq. The battalion operated out of Contingency Operating Base Adder in southern Iraq, conducting convoy escort missions with the 256th Infantry Brigade Combat Team of the Louisiana Army National Guard. The battalion received a Meritorious Unit Commendation for its actions. It was released from active duty and reverted to state control on 8 February 2011.

Company D of the 3rd Battalion and Company C of the 1st Battalion deployed to Iraq with Task Force 183 in August 2011, after being called into Federal service on 1 June. Operating out of Contingency Operating Base Adder, Company C conducted 56 convoy escort missions and earned 12 Bronze Star Medals. Company D conducted security and force protection missions. In December, the two companies returned to Camp Atterbury and transitioned back to the National Guard.

The 3rd Battalion, commanded by Lieutenant Colonel Kurt Kobernik, deployed to Camp As Sayliyah in Qatar as Task Force Normandy from September 2015 to July 2016. There, the battalion conducted security operations.

In July 2016, 3rd Battalion was replaced by the 1st Battalion of the regiment, commanded by Lieutenant Colonel Christopher Samulski. During this deployment, 1st Battalion soldiers searched more than 100,000 vehicles and 303,000 personnel seeking entry to U.S. military installations throughout the country. The 1st Battalion was relieved by the 1st Battalion, 138th Infantry Regiment of the Missouri Army National Guard in March 2017.

In November 2021, 1st Battalion, under command of LTC James Tierney, was called to active duty for a deployment in support of Combined Joint Task Force-Horn of Africa. 1st Battalion soldiers provided force protection throughout the Horn of Africa to include Djibouti, Somalia, and Kenya until relieved by 1st Battalion, 69th Infantry Regiment of the New York National Guard in September 2022.

== Current units ==
As of 2018, the following units of the parent regiment were active in the Virginia Army National Guard, assigned as components of the 116th Infantry Brigade Combat Team.

- 1st Battalion, 116th Infantry Regiment, headquartered in Lynchburg
- 3rd Battalion, 116th Infantry Regiment, headquartered in Winchester

== Commanders ==
The following officers commanded the 116th from 1917 to 1942:

- Colonel Robert F. Leedy (5 August – 29 December 1917)
- Colonel Hansford L. Threlkeld (29 December 1917 – 18 January 1918)
- Colonel William J. Perry (18 January – 1 June 1918)
- Lieutenant Colonel Hobert B. Brown (1–26 June 1918)
- Colonel Hansford L. Threlkeld (26 June – 21 August 1918)
- Colonel Archie J. Harris (21 August – 12 October 1918)
- Colonel Reginald Kelley (12 October – 1 December 1918)
- Colonel George W. Ball (1 December 1918 – 23 April 1919)
- Colonel FitzHugh L. Minnigerode (23 April – 30 May 1919)
- Colonel Hierome L. Opie (3 April 1922 – 26 June 1933)
- Colonel George M. Alexander (26 June 1933 – 6 June 1940)
- Colonel Evarts W. Opie (6 June 1940 – 10 October 1942)

== Heraldry ==
=== Distinctive unit insignia ===
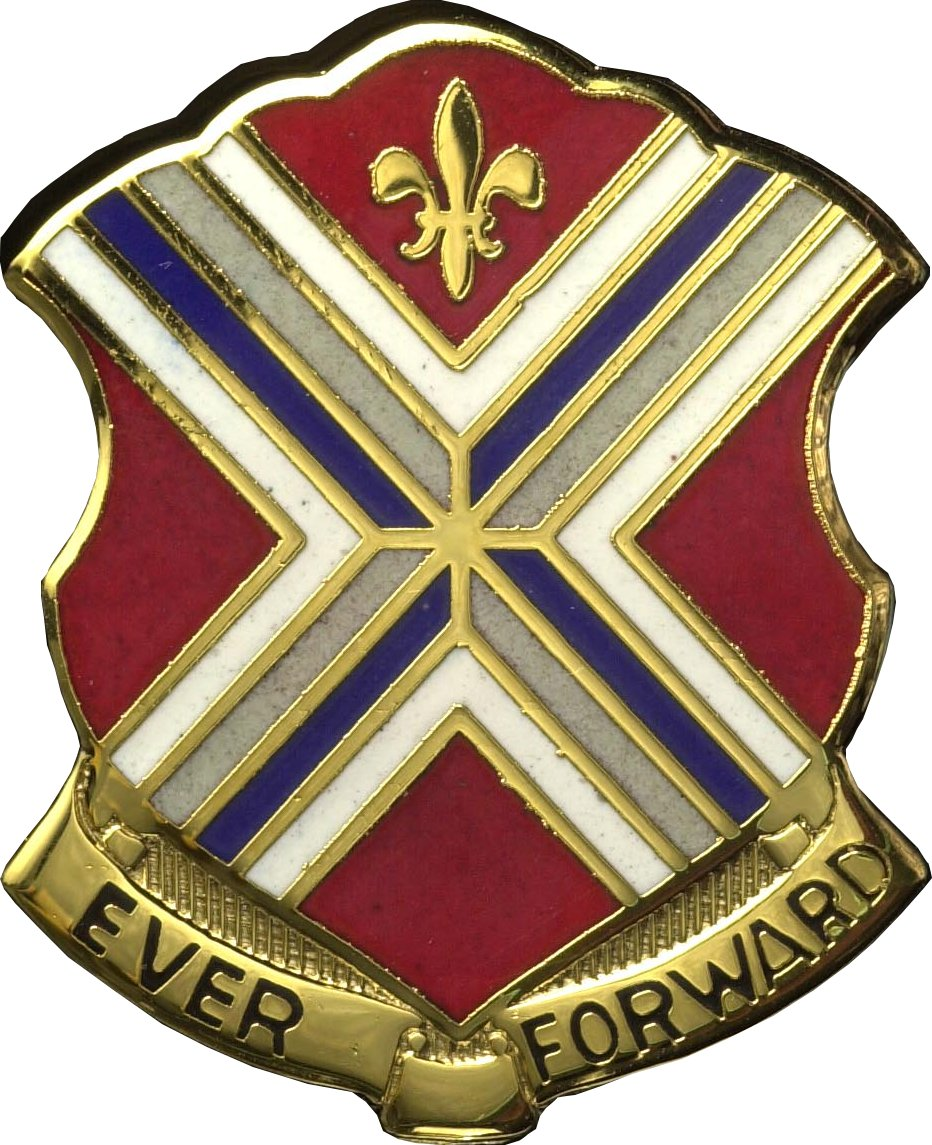
Distinctive Unit Insignia of the 116th Infantry (ARNG VA)

Approved on 31 March 1925, the Distinctive Unit Insignia is a Gold color metal and enamel device 13/16 inch (2.1 cm) in height overall consisting of a shield blazoned: Gules, a saltire Argent voided throughout per saltire Gray and Azure per cross counterchanged, in chief a fleur-de-lis Or. Attached below and to the sides of the shield a Gold bipartite scroll inscribed "EVER" to dexter and "FORWARD" to sinister in Black letters. The blue and gray on the insignia represents the mixed Confederate and Union lineage of the regiment and its artillery traditions. The fleur-de-lis symbolizes the regiment's service in France in World War I.

=== Coat of arms ===
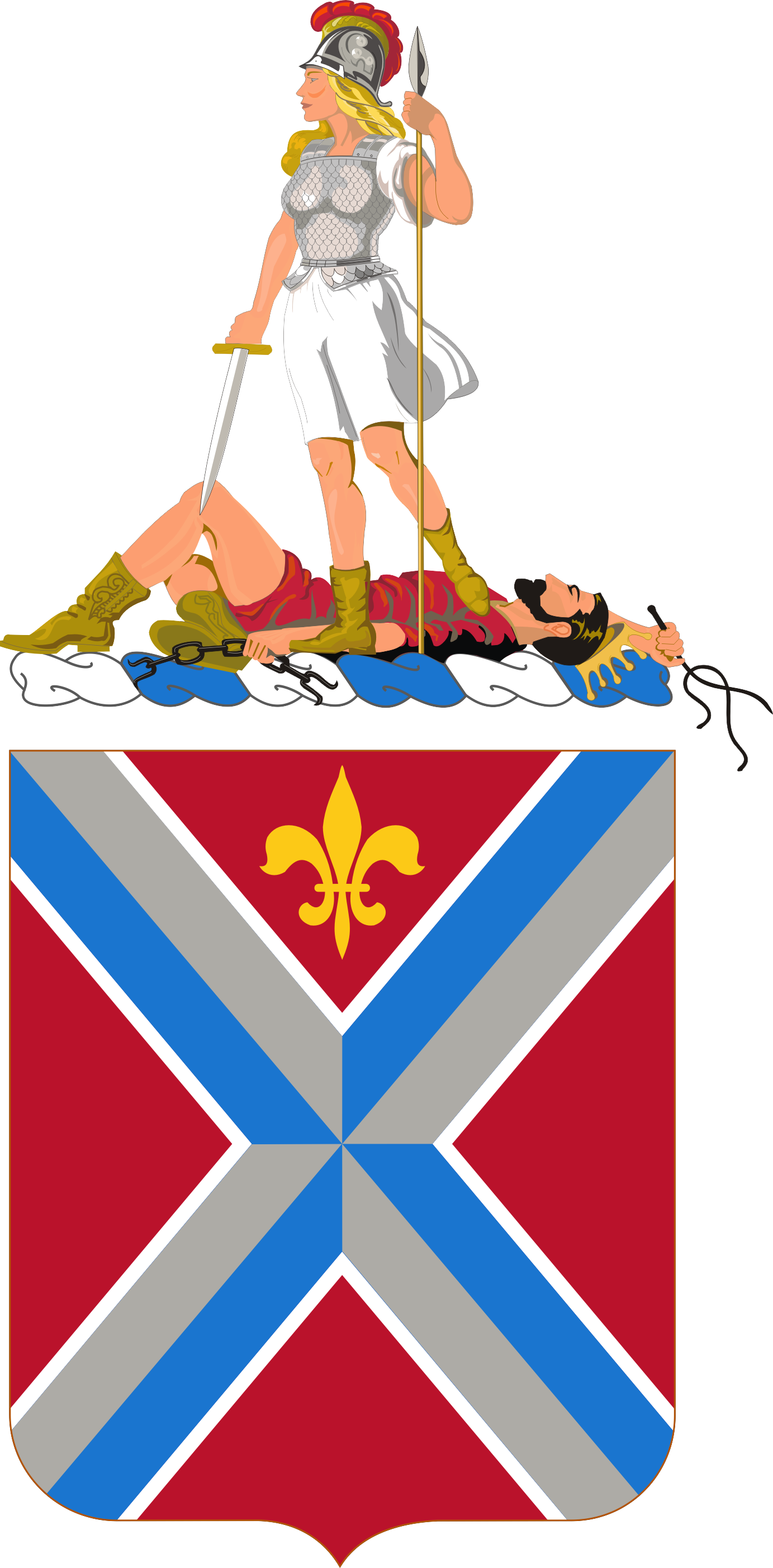
Coat of arms of the 116th Infantry

The coat of arms was approved on 19 April 1924. The blazon of the coat of arms includes a shield with Gules, a saltire Argent voided throughout per saltire Gray and Azure per cross counterchanged, in chief a fleur-de-lis Or. The fleur-de-lis symbolizes the regiment's service in France in World War I. The shield represents the mixed Confederate and Union lineage of the regiment and its artillery traditions. Its crest is that of the Virginia Army National Guard, including on a wreath of the colors Argent and Gules "Virtus, the genius of the Commonwealth, dressed as an Amazon, resting on a spear with one hand and holding a sword in the other, and treading on Tyranny, represented by a man prostrate, a crown falling from his head, a broken chain in his left hand and a scourge in his right" all Proper. It also includes the regimental motto of Ever Forward.

== Battle honors ==
The regiment received battle honors for the following actions:

Revolutionary War

- Brandywine
- Germantown
- Monmouth
- Charleston
- Cowpens
- Guilford Court House
- Yorktown
- Virginia 1775
- Virginia 1776
- Virginia 1781
- South Carolina 1781
- North Carolina 1781

War of 1812

- Maryland 1814

Civil War (Confederate service)

- First Manassas
- Peninsula
- Valley
- Second Manassas
- Sharpsburg
- Fredericksburg
- Chancellorsville
- Gettysburg
- Wilderness
- Spotsylvania
- Cold Harbor
- Petersburg
- Appomattox
- Virginia 1861
- Virginia 1862
- Virginia 1863
- Virginia 1864
- Maryland 1864

World War I

- Meuse-Argonne
- Alsace 1918

World War II

- Normandy (with arrowhead)
- Northern France
- Rhineland
- Central Europe

War on Terrorism

Afghanistan

- Consolidation I

Iraq

- Iraqi Surge (earned by Companies A, B, and C, 3rd Battalion)

Headquarters Company (Lynchburg Home Guard), 2d Battalion, additionally entitled to:

Civil War (Confederate service)

- North Carolina 1863
- North Carolina 1864

World War I

- Champagne-Marne
- Aisne-Marne
- St. Mihiel
- Lorraine 1918
- Champagne 1918

Company A (Monticello Guard, Charlottesville) and Support Company (Farmville Guard), 2d Battalion, each additionally entitled to:

Civil War (Confederate service)

- North Carolina 1863

Companies A and B (Alexandria Light Infantry, Manassas), 3d Battalion, each additionally entitled to:

Civil War (Confederate service)

- Tennessee 1863

Company B, 3rd Battalion (Woodstock), additionally entitled to:

War on Terrorism

Iraq

- National Resolution

== Decorations ==
The regiment was awarded the following decorations.

- Presidential Unit Citation (Army), Streamer embroidered NORMANDY
- French Croix de Guerre with Palm, World War II, Streamer embroidered BEACHES OF NORMANDY
- Army Superior Unit Award, Streamer embroidered 1992–1993
- Army Superior Unit Award, Streamer embroidered 2006–2007
- Army Superior Unit Award, Streamer embroidered 2008–2009 (earned by the 1st Battalion)

Headquarters Company (Roanoke) and Company A (Bedford), 1st Battalion, and Headquarters Company (Lynchburg Home Guard), 2d Battalion, each additionally entitled to:

- Presidential Unit Citation (Army), Streamer embroidered VIRE
- French Croix de Guerre with Silver-Gilt Star, World War II, Streamer embroidered VIRE

The 1st Battalion's Headquarters Company, and Companies A, B, and C are additionally entitled to:

- Meritorious Unit Commendation (Army), Streamer embroidered IRAQ 2010

The 3rd Battalion's Headquarters Company, and Companies A, B, C, and D are additionally entitled to:

- Meritorious Unit Commendation (Army), Streamer embroidered SOUTHWEST ASIA 2007–2008
