= Robert Leedy =

Robert Leedy may refer to:

- Ski Hi Lee (Robert E. Leedy, 1921–1974), Canadian professional wrestler, boxer and actor
- Robert Franklin Leedy (1863–1924), lawyer, soldier, and Virginia state legislator
