= Frank D. Peregory =

US Army technical sergeant

Frank Dabney Peregory
- Frank Dabney Peregory
- Born: Frank Dabney Peregoy; April 10, 1916; Esmont, Virginia, U.S.
- Died: June 14, 1944 (aged 28); Normandy, France
- Burial place: Normandy American Cemetery and Memorial, Normandy, France
- Military career
- Allegiance: United States
- Branch: United States Army
- Service years: 1931–1944
- Rank: Technical sergeant
- Units: 3rd Battalion, 116th Infantry Regiment, 29th Infantry Division
- Conflicts: World War II †: Normandy Invasion
- Awards: Medal of Honor; Purple Heart; Soldier's Medal

Frank Dabney Peregory (April 10, 1916 - June 14, 1944) was a United States Army technical sergeant who posthumously received the United States military's highest decoration for bravery in combat, the Medal of Honor, for his actions during World War II. In a previous incident, he also received the Soldier's Medal for rescuing another soldier from drowning.

Peregory grew up in a large family in Virginia. Although he was only 15 years old, in 1931, he lied about his age in order to join the Virginia Army National Guard. When the United States entered World War II in December 1941 his unit was activated. While guarding a beach, Peregory received the Soldier's Medal for saving a fellow soldier from drowning.

When the unit arrived for combat overseas, they were assigned to the D-Day invasion of Normandy. Peregory again risked his life by single-handedly attacking a fortified German machine-gun emplacement, killing 8 and taking 35 prisoners. For his actions during the battle, he posthumously received the Medal of Honor on June 5, 1945. The Medal was presented posthumously, because on June 14, 1944, six days after the action for which he would be awarded the Medal of Honor, he was killed.

== Early life and name ==
He was born April 10, 1916, at Esmont, Virginia, and grew up in a large, impoverished, but tightly knit family in Albemarle County, Virginia. According to Virginia historian Richard H. Britton, Peregory's family name is actually spelled "Peregoy", although most references incorrectly spell his name "Peregory." His birth year is also typically given erroneously as 1915, possibly because he originally lied about his age at enlistment.

== Military career ==
Peregoy's mother died in 1931, forcing him to quit school to help his father support his seven siblings. In May, Peregoy joined Company K ("Monticello Guard") of the 116th Infantry Regiment of the Virginia National Guard at Charlottesville, the seat of Albemarle County. Because Peregoy was only fifteen at the time, he lied about his year of birth. The error became part of his official military records, along with an accidental misspelling of his surname. In 1941, Peregory married Bessie Kirby. Before the entrance of the United States into World War II, Peregory's unit was inducted into federal service on February 3, 1941.

As a member of the 29th Division Peregory moved with it to Fort Meade, Maryland, and the unit began training for participation in the war. While patrolling a beach in North Carolina shortly after the Pearl Harbor attack, Peregoy rescued a drowning comrade. In recognition of his action and disregard of danger to himself, he was awarded the Soldier's Medal, the highest non-combat award that a soldier can receive for heroism. The 29th was then sent overseas to train in Scotland and England for the next two years. The 29th was selected along with the Regular Army's 1st Infantry Division to attack one of five fortified beaches, codenamed Omaha.

=== Medal of Honor action ===
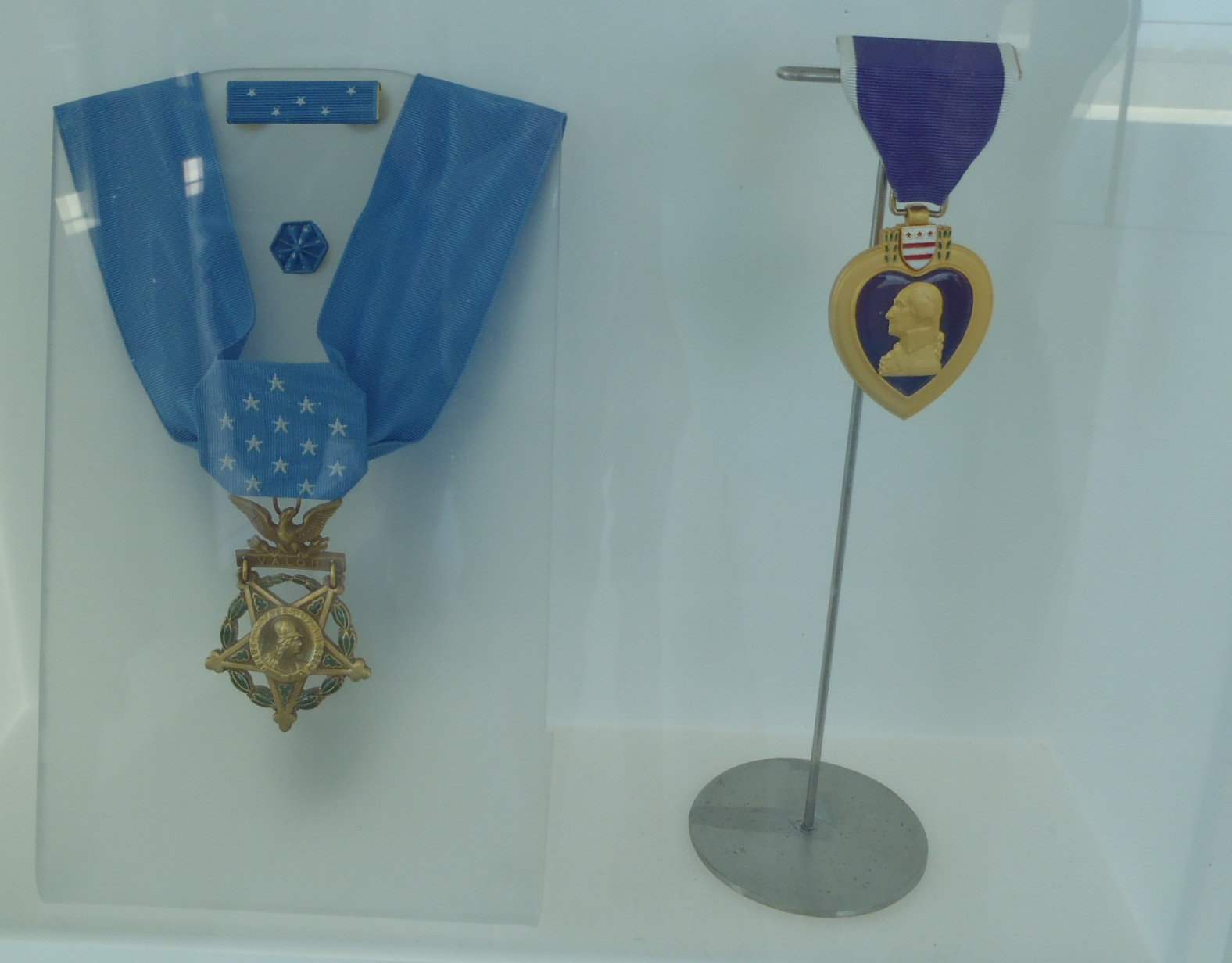
Peregory's Medal of Honor and Purple Heart

After the assault had been postponed several times, on June 6, 1944, Peregory landed with the 116th at Omaha Beach as part of the Normandy Invasion, also known as D-Day. His unit was among the first wave of troops to assault the beach but despite fierce enemy resistance that included heavy shelling and machine gun fire, his unit made its way to the town of Grandcamp-Maisy, by June 8.

While his unit advanced on the German defenses, the leading elements began receiving fire from German forces. The Germans were firmly entrenched on high ground overlooking the town and were able to inflict severe damage on Allied forces as they approached. Numerous attempts to neutralize the enemy position by supporting artillery and tank fire had proved ineffective until Technical Sergeant Peregoy risked his own life by advancing up the hill under heavy enemy fire. He worked his way to the crest of the hill, where he discovered an entrenchment which led to the main enemy fortifications 200 yards away. Without hesitating, he leapt into the trench and moved toward the emplacement. When he encountered a squad of enemy riflemen, he attacked them with hand grenades and his bayonet, killing eight and forcing three to surrender. He then continued along the trench, forcing 32 more German soldiers to surrender, including the machine gunners. This action opened the way for the leading elements of the battalion to advance and secure their objective. For his actions, Peregoy was recommended and approved for the Medal of Honor.

== Death and burial ==
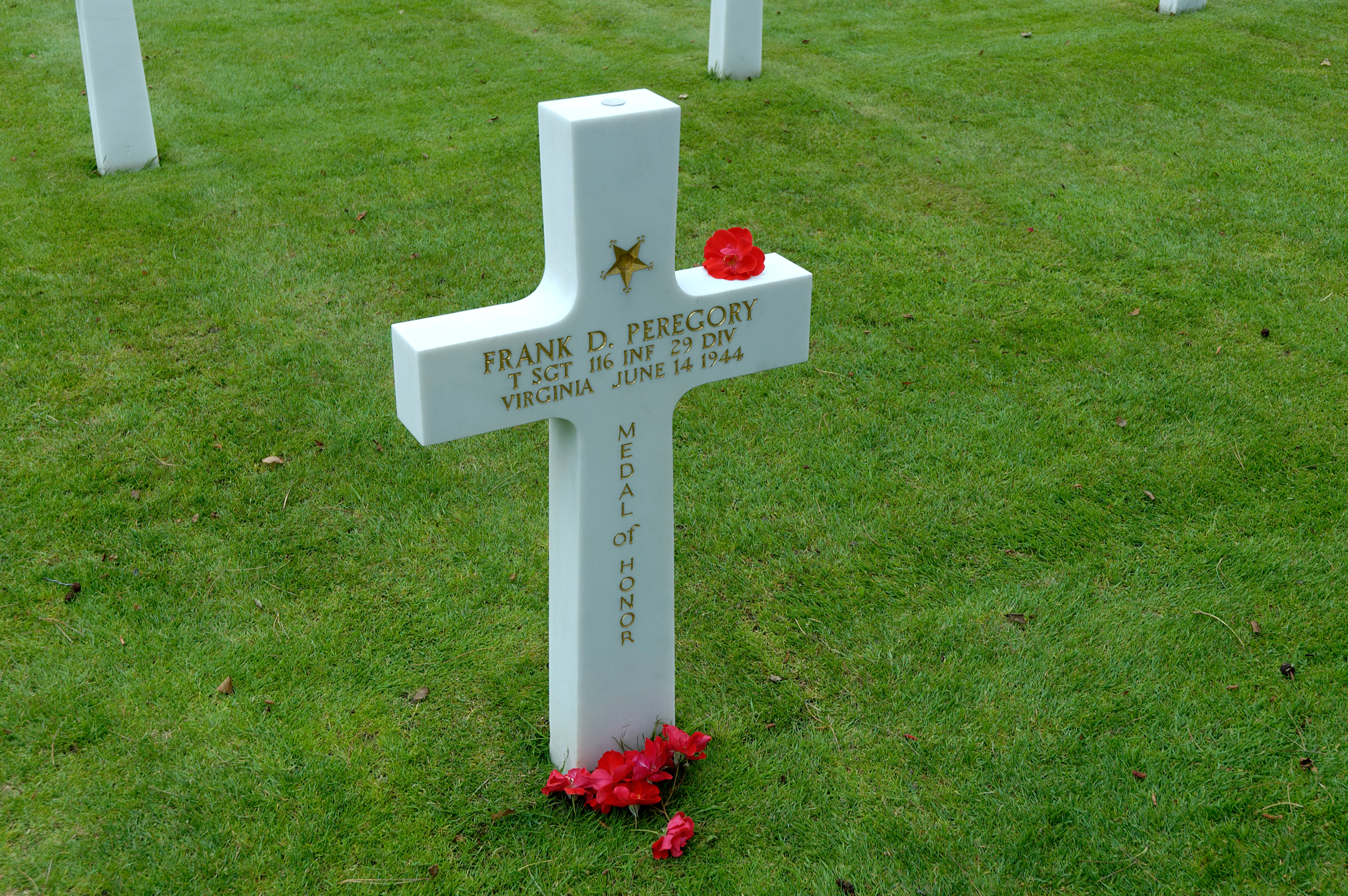
Gravestone at the Normandy American Cemetery and Memorial

Six days later, Peregory was killed while fighting in the hedgerows. He is buried at the American Battle Monuments Cemetery in Normandy also known as Normandy American Cemetery and Memorial in Colleville-sur-Mer, Basse-Normandie region, France.

== Medal of Honor Citation ==
His Medal of Honor citation reads: Citation:

On 8 June 1944, the 3rd Battalion of the 116th Infantry was advancing on the strongly held German defenses at Grandcamp-Maisy, France, when the leading elements were suddenly halted by decimating machine gun fire from a firmly entrenched enemy force on the high ground overlooking the town. After numerous attempts to neutralize the enemy position by supporting artillery and tank fire had proved ineffective, T/Sgt. Peregory, on his own initiative, advanced up the hill under withering fire, and worked his way to the crest where he discovered an entrenchment leading to the main enemy fortifications 200 yards away. Without hesitating, he leaped into the trench and moved toward the emplacement. Encountering a squad of enemy riflemen, he fearlessly attacked them with hand grenades and bayonet, killed 8 and forced 3 to surrender. Continuing along the trench, he single-handedly forced the surrender of 32 more riflemen, captured the machine gunners, and opened the way for the leading elements of the battalion to advance and secure its objective. The extraordinary gallantry and aggressiveness displayed by T/Sgt. Peregory are exemplary of the highest tradition of the armed forces.

== Awards and decorations ==

Badge	Combat Infantryman Badge		
1st row	Medal of Honor	Soldier's Medal	Bronze Star Medal
2nd row	Purple Heart	Army Good Conduct Medal	American Defense Service Medal
3rd row	American Campaign Medal	European–African–Middle Eastern Campaign Medal with Arrowhead device and 1 Campaign star	World War II Victory Medal

== Honors ==
On June 5, 1945, Peregoy's widow, Bessie Peregoy was presented her husband's Medal of Honor in Charlottesville's New City Armory. A building complex at Fort Pickett in Virginia was dedicated to Peregoy in 1984. In June 2010 a rededication ceremony was held and a new monument was unveiled with descriptions of his actions regarding the Medal of Honor and the Soldiers Medal. The Frank D. Peregory United States Army Reserve Center, located in Charlottesville, Virginia is named in his honor as well as the Frank D. Peregory Fitness Center located in Camp McGovern, Bosnia. The street on which the Virginia National Guard Armory in Charlottesville lies was also named Peregory Lane, in his honor. In 2016, the name of the street was changed to "Peregoy" in order to correct the spelling. The Albemarle County Board of Supervisors passed a resolution in April to declare his birthday "Frank Peregoy Day".

== See also ==
- List of Medal of Honor recipients for World War II
