= Charles D. W. Canham =

United States Army general

Charles D.W. Canham
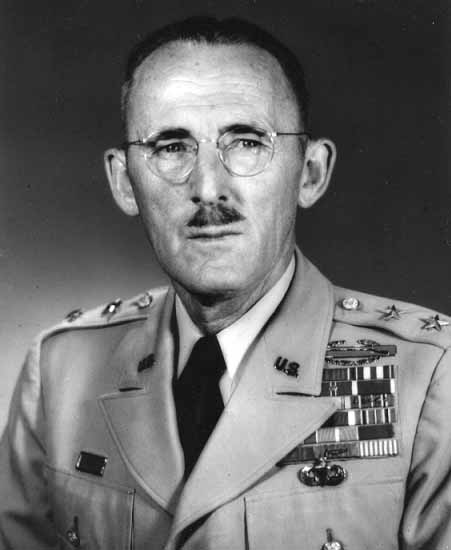
- Maj. Gen. Charles D. W. Canham
- Born: January 26, 1901; Kola, Covington County, Mississippi, U.S.
- Died: August 21, 1963 (aged 62); Washington, D.C., U.S.
- Burial place: Arlington National Cemetery
- Military career
- Allegiance: United States of America
- Branch: United States Army
- Service years: 1919-1960
- Rank: Major General
- Commands: 29th Infantry Division; 3rd Infantry Division; 82nd Airborne Division; XI Corps
- Conflicts: Normandy Invasion
- Awards: Distinguished Service Cross; Silver Star; Bronze Star; Purple Heart; Combat Infantryman Badge

Major General Charles Draper William Canham (January 26, 1901 – August 21, 1963) was the commander of the 29th Infantry Division's 116th Infantry Regiment, which landed on Omaha Beach in Normandy, France, on D-Day, June 6, 1944.

== Biography ==
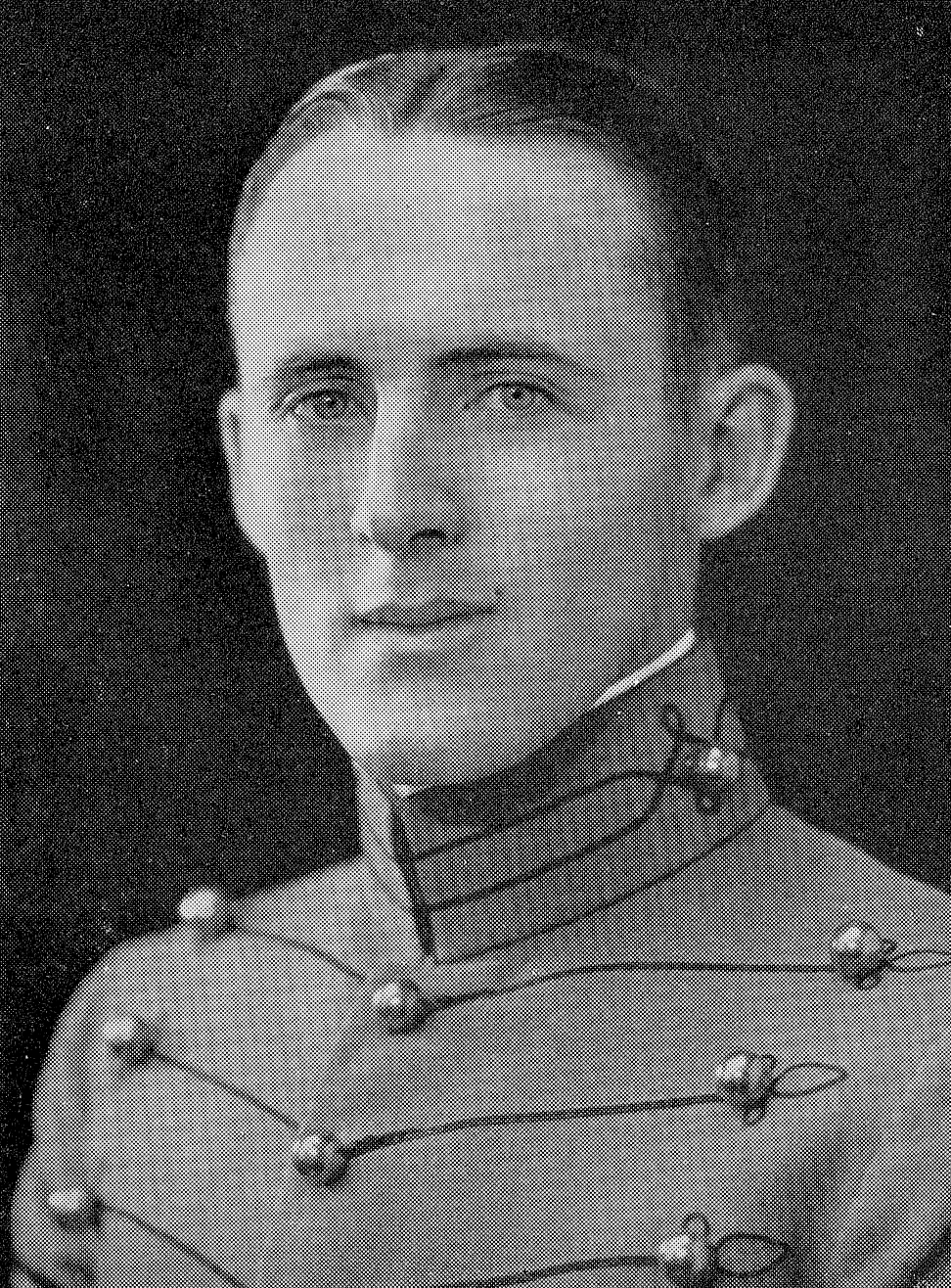
At West Point in 1926

Charles D. W. Canham was born in Kola, Mississippi, on January 26, 1901. He joined the Army on May 23, 1919. In 1921, as a sergeant, Canham took a course in the Army's first preparatory school to allow soldiers from the ranks to attend the United States Military Academy. He was chosen, and graduated from West Point in 1926.

Prior to World War II, he served in the Philippines and Shanghai and was one of the purchasers of the Shanghai Bowl. During these years he acquired a reputation as a strict disciplinarian and superb leader of troops.

=== World War II ===
In 1942, as a colonel, he took command of the 116th Infantry Regiment shortly before it sailed for England. Canham's 116th Infantry, alongside the 1st Infantry Division's 16th Infantry Regiment, was chosen as the first to land at Omaha beach on D-Day. The opening scene of the movie Saving Private Ryan depicts the conditions under which Canham's regiment landed on the Dog Green (A Co)/White (G Co)/Red (F Co) sectors of Omaha Beach along with one company of Army Rangers. Shortly after hitting the beach, Canham was shot through the wrist, refusing evacuation, he moved his men off Omaha and inland. Sergeant Bob Slaughter (D Company, 116th) remembers Canham screaming at soldiers to move off the beach and go kill Germans. Slaughter remembers him yelling at one lieutenant hiding in a pillbox from a German mortar barrage, "Get your ass out of there and show some leadership!". Don McCarthy (Headquarters Company, 116th) remembers seeing Canham walking upright along the beach in the face of enemy fire, "I got the hell out of there and moved forward. I was more afraid of Colonel Canham than I was of the Germans."

For his actions on Omaha Beach, and the fighting to take Saint Lô, he received the United States' second highest award for valor in combat, the Distinguished Service Cross.

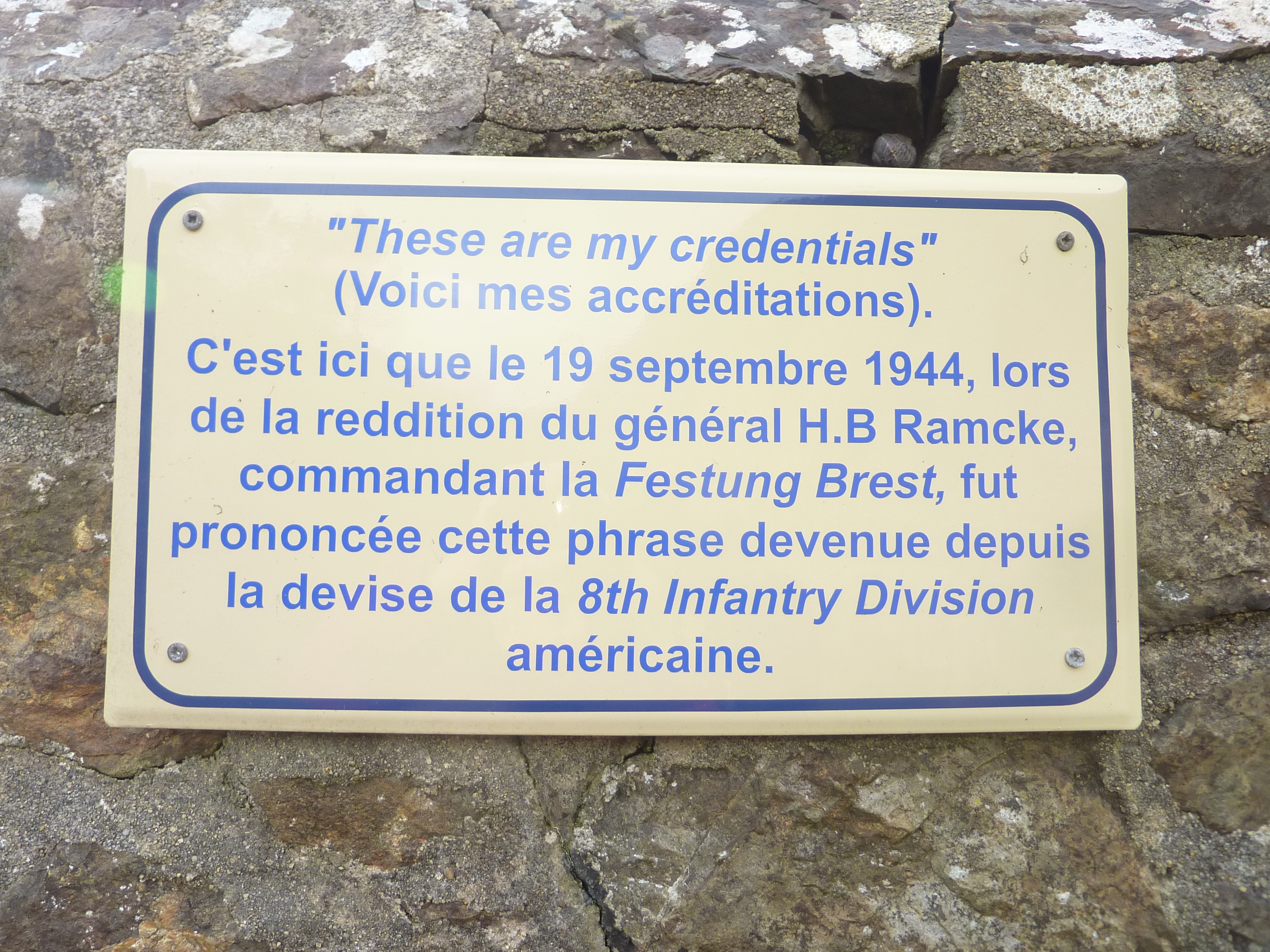
Commemorative plaque of General Hermann-Bernhard Ramcke's surrender, September 19, 1944 (ammunition bay near the fort des Capucins)

Soon afterwards Canham was promoted to Brigadier General and was named as the Assistant Division Commander of the 8th Infantry Division. It was in this capacity during the surrender of the German garrison at the Port of Brest (see Battle for Brest) that Canham spoke the words that would become the 8th Infantry Division's motto. Upon entering the headquarters of General der Fallschirmtruppe (a three-star rank) Hermann-Bernhard Ramcke, a leader of German paratroops, Ramcke demanded to know the lower ranking Canham's credentials as a condition of surrender. Unruffled, Canham pointed to the dirty and tired American soldiers he had brought with him to witness the surrender and said, "These are my credentials." The account of this event, which was reported in The New York Times, saw in this spontaneous statement of a combat leader the greatest tribute ever paid to the real power of the American Army, the individual soldier.

By the end of World War II, Canham had earned every award for valor except the Medal of Honor from the United States. He was awarded the Distinguished Service Order by General Bernard L. Montgomery of the British Army and several awards for valor from France.

After the war, Canham was Assistant Division Commander of the 82nd Airborne Division and later became commanding general of the 82nd. He was also the commanding general of the 3rd Infantry Division and the commanding general of XI Corps.

=== Later life ===
Canham retired from the Army in 1960 with 41 years of service. He died on August 21, 1963, at Walter Reed General Hospital aged 62 years, and is interred at Arlington National Cemetery.
