= Mountain Grove (Esmont, Virginia) =

Historic house in Virginia, United States

- U.S. National Register of Historic Places
- Virginia Landmarks Register
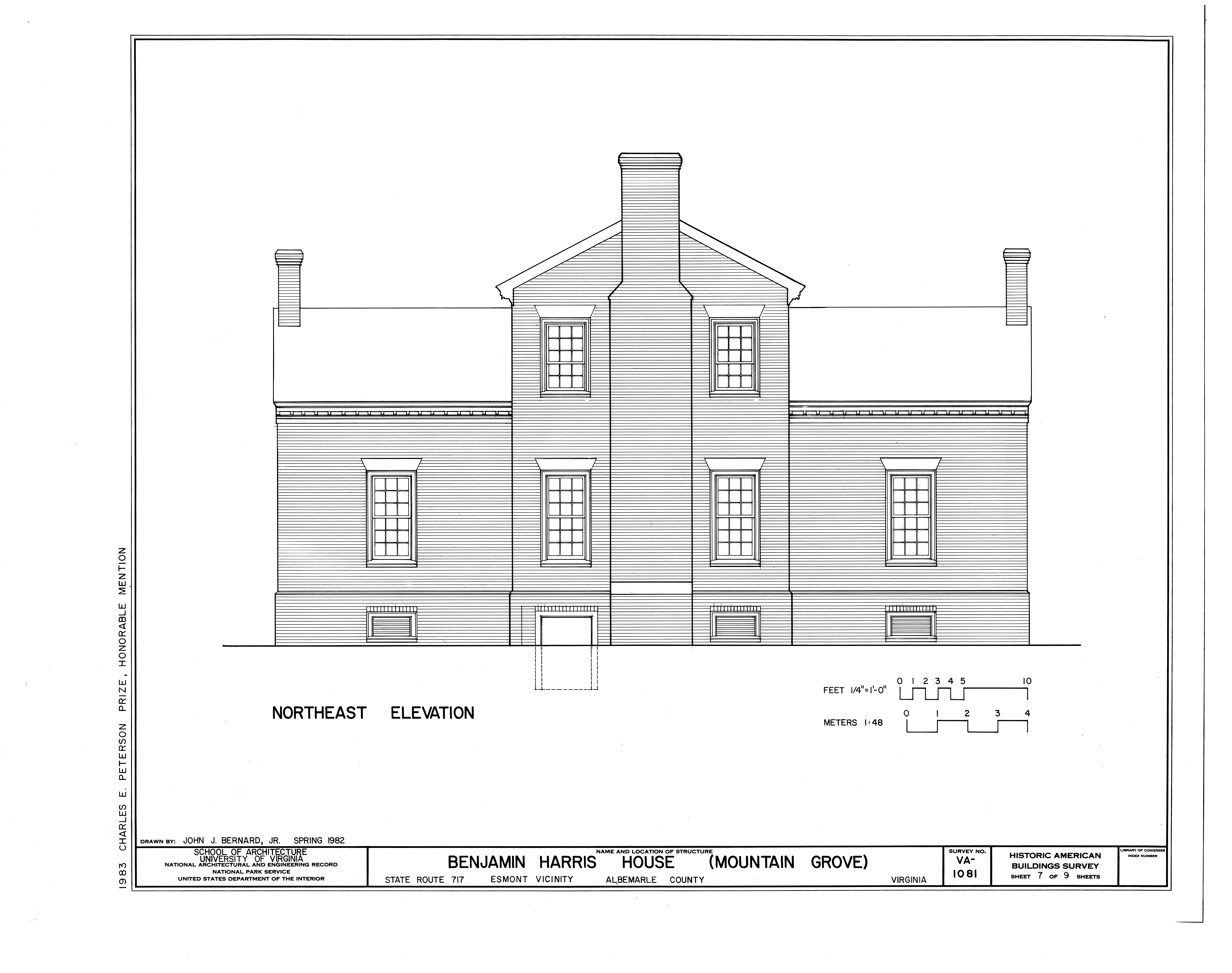
- Drawing of the house

- Location within Virginia Location within the United States
- Location: Northwest of Esmont on VA 717, near Esmont, Virginia
- Coordinates: 37°50′08″N 78°38′38″W
- Area: 19 acres (7.7 ha)
- Built: 1803-1804
- Architectural style: Early Republic, Jeffersonian
- NRHP reference No.: 80004164
- VLR No.: 002-0095

Significant dates
- Added to NRHP: September 8, 1980
- Designated VLR: May 20, 1980

Mountain Grove, also known as the Benjamin Harris House, is a historic home located near Esmont, Albemarle County, Virginia. The house was built in 1803–1804, and consists of a two-story, three-bay center block flanked by single-bay, 1 1/2-story wings, in the Jeffersonian style. The brick dwelling sits on a high basement and the center block is treated as a classical temple motif, is capped by a pedimented gable roof. Also on the property are the brick ruins of a 19th-century kitchen.

It was added to the National Register of Historic Places in 1980.
