= Guthrie Hall (Esmont, Virginia) =

Historic house in Virginia, United States

- U.S. National Register of Historic Places
- Virginia Landmarks Register
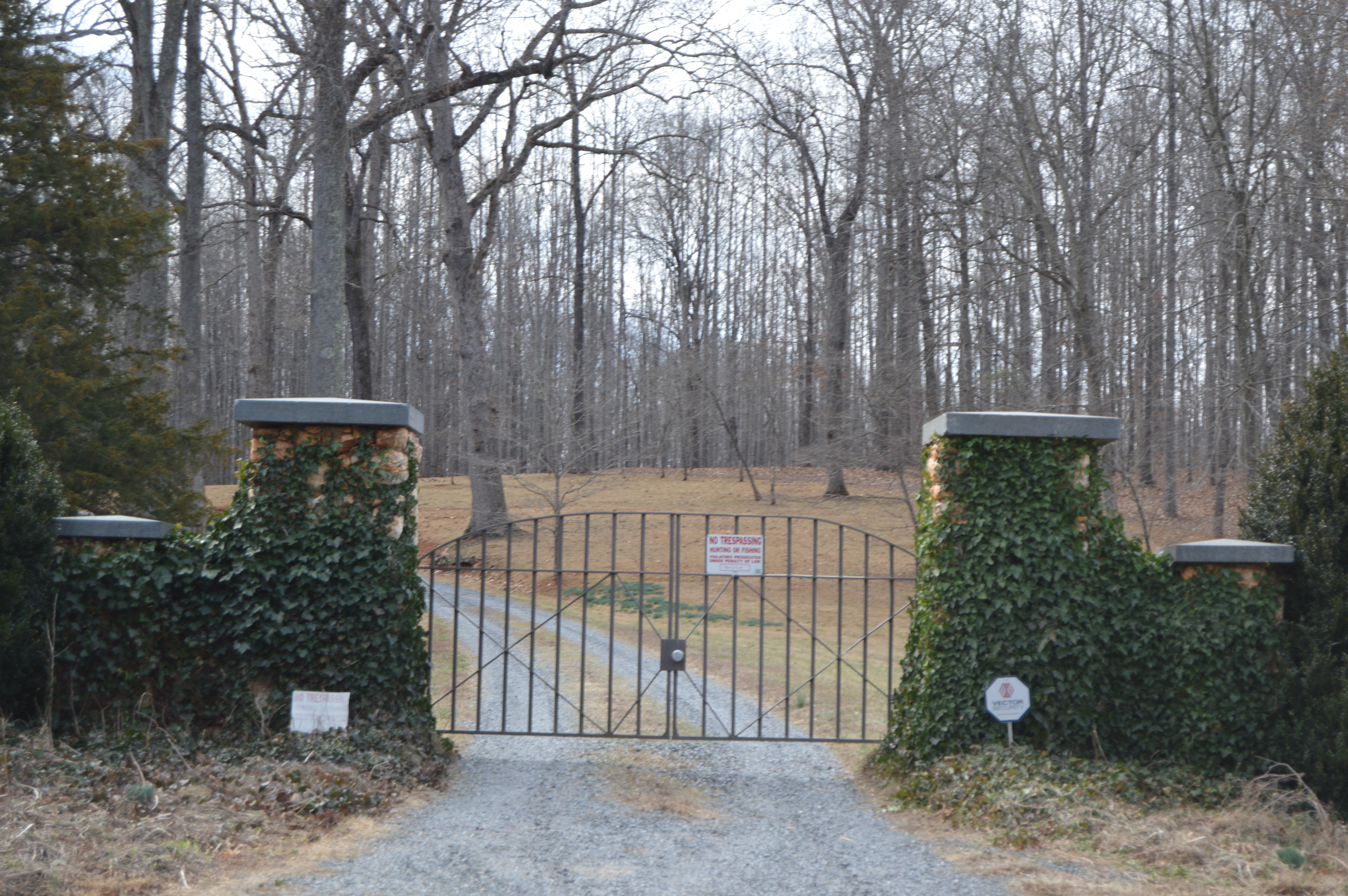
- Entrance to the property

- Location within Virginia Location within the United States
- Location: North of Esmont on VA 719, near Esmont, Virginia
- Coordinates: 37°50′59″N 78°36′38″W
- Area: 26 acres (11 ha)
- Built: 1901
- Architect: Stanford White, Fred Kennedy
- Architectural style: Colonial Revival
- NRHP reference No.: 82004534
- VLR No.: 002-0355

Significant dates
- Added to NRHP: September 23, 1982
- Designated VLR: March 17, 1981

Guthrie Hall is a historic mansion located near Esmont, Albemarle County, Virginia. It was built in 1901, and is a 2 1/2-story, seven-bay, concrete structure faced in quartz in the Colonial Revival style. It is topped by a standing-seam sheet metal hipped roof with a copper wash pierced by shed-roofed dormers. The front facade features a two-story Doric order portico with three dormers that open onto the portico roof.

It was added to the National Register of Historic Places in 1982.
