= Esmont =

Historic house in Virginia, United States

- U.S. National Register of Historic Places
- Virginia Landmarks Register
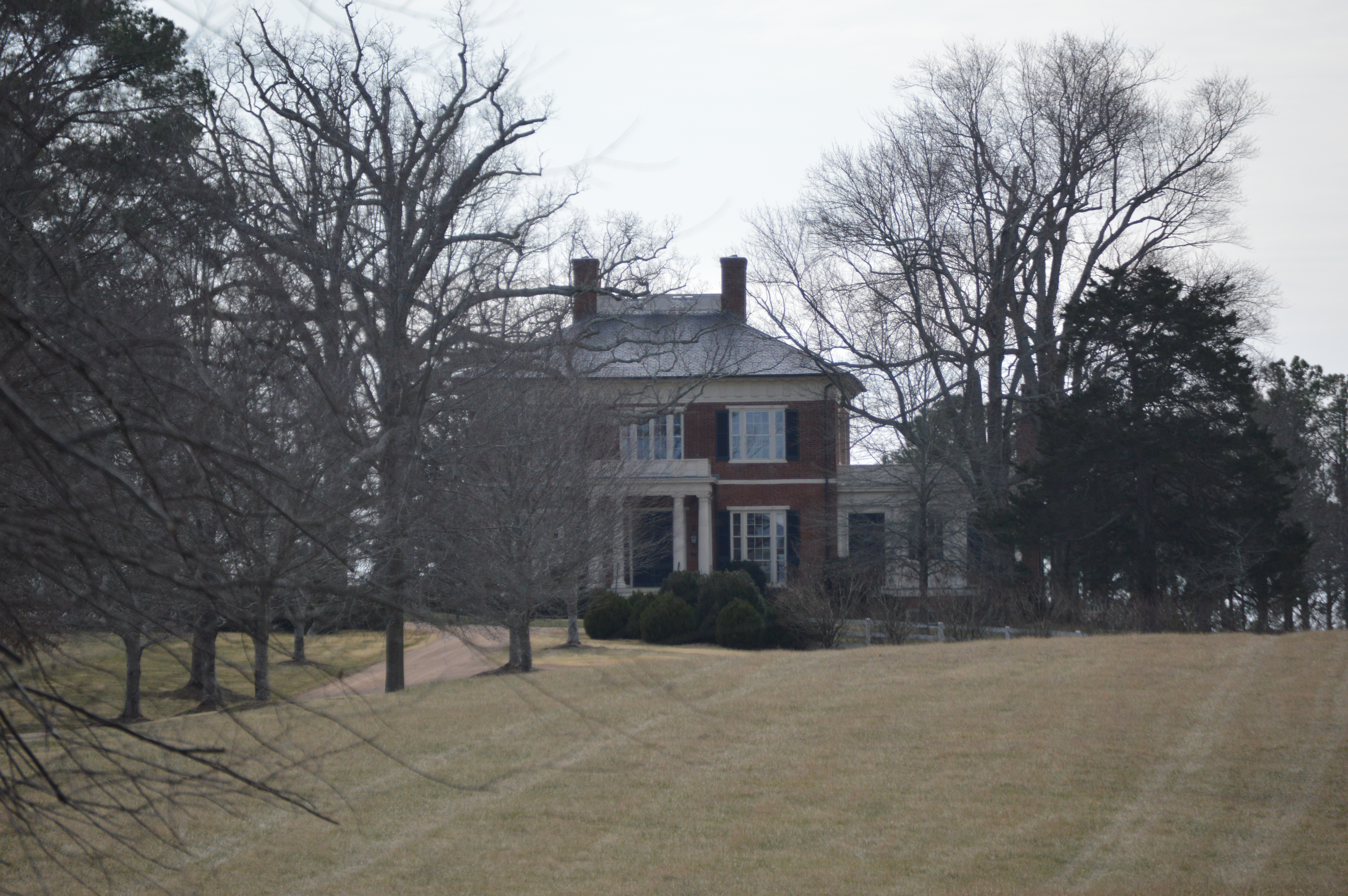
- Front of the estate house

- Location within Virginia Location within the United States
- Location: North of Esmont, near Esmont, Virginia
- Coordinates: 37°50′33″N 78°36′23″W
- Area: 53 acres (21 ha)
- Built: 1818
- Built by: Floyd Johnson
- Architectural style: Early Republic, Jeffersonian
- NRHP reference No.: 80004163
- VLR No.: 002-0030

Significant dates
- Added to NRHP: May 6, 1980
- Designated VLR: May 17, 1977

Esmont is a historic home located near Esmont, Albemarle County, Virginia. The house was built about 1818, and is a two-story, three-bay, square structure in the Jeffersonian style. It has a double pile, central passage plan. It is topped by a low hipped roof, surmounted by internal chimneys, further emphasized by the use of a balustrade with alternating solid and Chinese lattice panels. The front facade features a full-length tetrastyle porch with Doric order columns and entablature. Also on the property are a contributing brick kitchen with a low hipped roof, office, a dairy and a smokehouse. The house was built for Dr. Charles Cocke, a nephew of James Powell Cocke who built the Edgemont.

It was added to the National Register of Historic Places in 1977.
