= USS Matsonia =

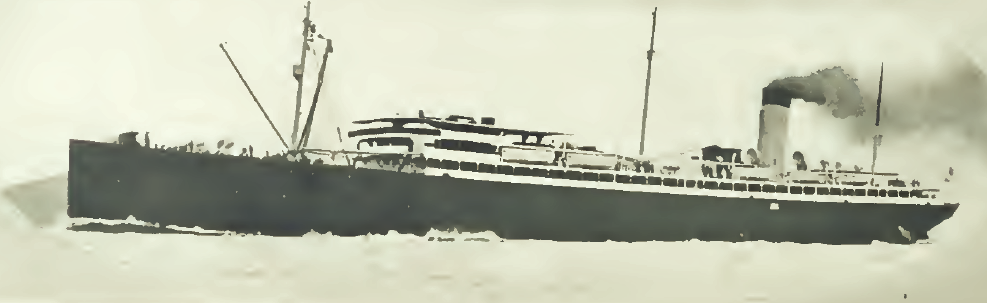
- Matsonia in commercial service

History
- Name: SS Matsonia
- Owner: Matson Navigation Company
- Builder: Newport News Ship Building Company; Newport News, Virginia
- Launched: 1913
- Fate: acquired by U.S. Navy, 22 January 1918
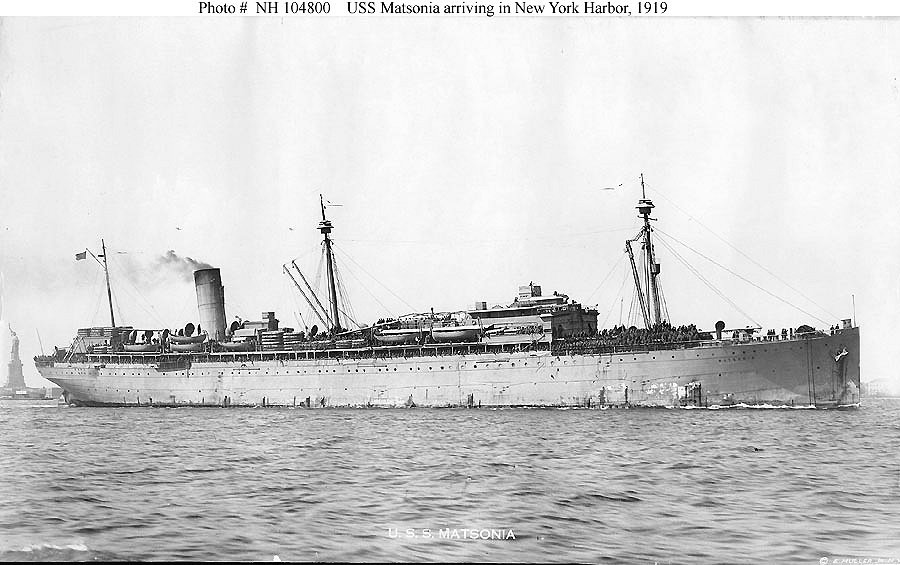
- Arriving in New York Harbor at the end of a voyage from Europe, 1919 with troops

History

United States
- Name: USS Matsonia (ID-1589)
- Acquired: 22 January 1918
- Commissioned: 1 March 1918
- Decommissioned: 12 September 1919
- Fate: returned to her former owner, 17 September 1919

History
- Name: 1919–1937: SS Matsonia; 1937–1940: SS Etolin
- Owner: 1919–1937: Matson Navigation Company; 1937–1940: Alaska Packers Association
- Fate: chartered to the United States Army, August 1940

History

United States
- Name: USAT Matsonia
- Acquired: August 1940
- In service: August 1940
- Out of service: 28 April 1946
- Fate: transferred to James River Reserve Fleet, 28 April 1946; scrapped, 1957

General characteristics (as USS Matsonia, 1918–1919)
- Displacement: 16,800 tons (normal)
- Length: 501 ft 4 in (152.81 m)
- Beam: 58 ft 1 in (17.70 m)
- Draft: 29 ft (8.8 m) (mean)
- Speed: 17 knots (31 km/h)
- Armament: 4 × 6-inch (150 mm) guns; 2 × 1-pounder guns; 2 × machine guns

USS Matsonia (ID-1589) was a troopship used by the United States Navy during World War I. Before and after her Navy service she was ocean liner SS Matsonia for the Matson Navigation Company. The liner was sold in 1937 to the Alaska Packers Association and renamed SS Etolin. Shortly before World War II, the ship was chartered by the United States Army as USAT Etolin. Transferred to the War Shipping Administration in 1946, Etolin was placed in the James River Reserve Fleet and ultimately scrapped in 1957.

== History ==
Matsonia, built by the Newport News Ship Building Company of Newport News, Virginia, in 1913, served the Matson Navigation Company until taken over by the U.S. Shipping Board and turned over to the Navy at New York by way of the Panama Canal, 22 January 1918, for use as a troop transport. She was commissioned 1 March 1918, Captain John M. Luby in command.

Beginning 14 March, when she sailed for France with troops and Army cargo, Matsonia completed six round trips to Europe prior to the Armistice. The preparation to turn the Matsonia into a troop carrier involved ripping out mahogany staircases "as if they were worth nothing" and using every bit of space by rigging up 3,000 soldier bunks wherever they could be rigged. During her second France-bound trip during World War I the convoy was attacked by a German U-boat that was sunk about 800 meters from the Matsonia. During that time she transferred 13,329 passengers to Europe, and carried back only 10. After the Armistice she continued her transatlantic crossings to return over 23,000 troops in 8 voyages, ending such crossings at New York on 20 August 1919. She was decommissioned on 12 September 1919 and returned to her former owner on 17 September.

On 26 March 1937 S.S. Matsonia sailed from San Francisco to Honolulu with Captain F.A. Johnson, USNR, Commanding. In 1937, Matsonia was sold to Alaskan interests and renamed Etolin. The U.S. Army chartered her for troopship service in August 1940 and kept her through World War II, retaining her second name. On 5 December 1941 Etolin with 1,400 troops embarked departed San Francisco in company with the then chartered Army transport Tasker H. Bliss bound for the Philippines. The ships were turned back to San Francisco after the attack on Pearl Harbor and disembarked the troops 8–9 December. She made prewar voyages to the Philippines on voyages that included Alaska and Hawaii and, in early 1942, steamed down to South America before returning to the Hawaiian transport route. Later in that year, Etolin went to Baltimore, Maryland, where she was extensively overhauled. After arriving back at San Francisco, California, in July 1943, she operated from the U.S. to Australia and Hawaii. After repairs that lasted from the last part of 1944 through first seven months of 1945, USAT Etolin twice crossed the Pacific to Japan and Okinawa. During early 1946, she served between New Orleans, Louisiana, and Panama, before being turned over to the War Shipping Administration in late April 1946 for layup in the James River (Virginia) Reserve Fleet. Etolin was scrapped at Baltimore, Maryland, in 1957.
