= Esmont, Virginia =

Esmont
- Census-designated place
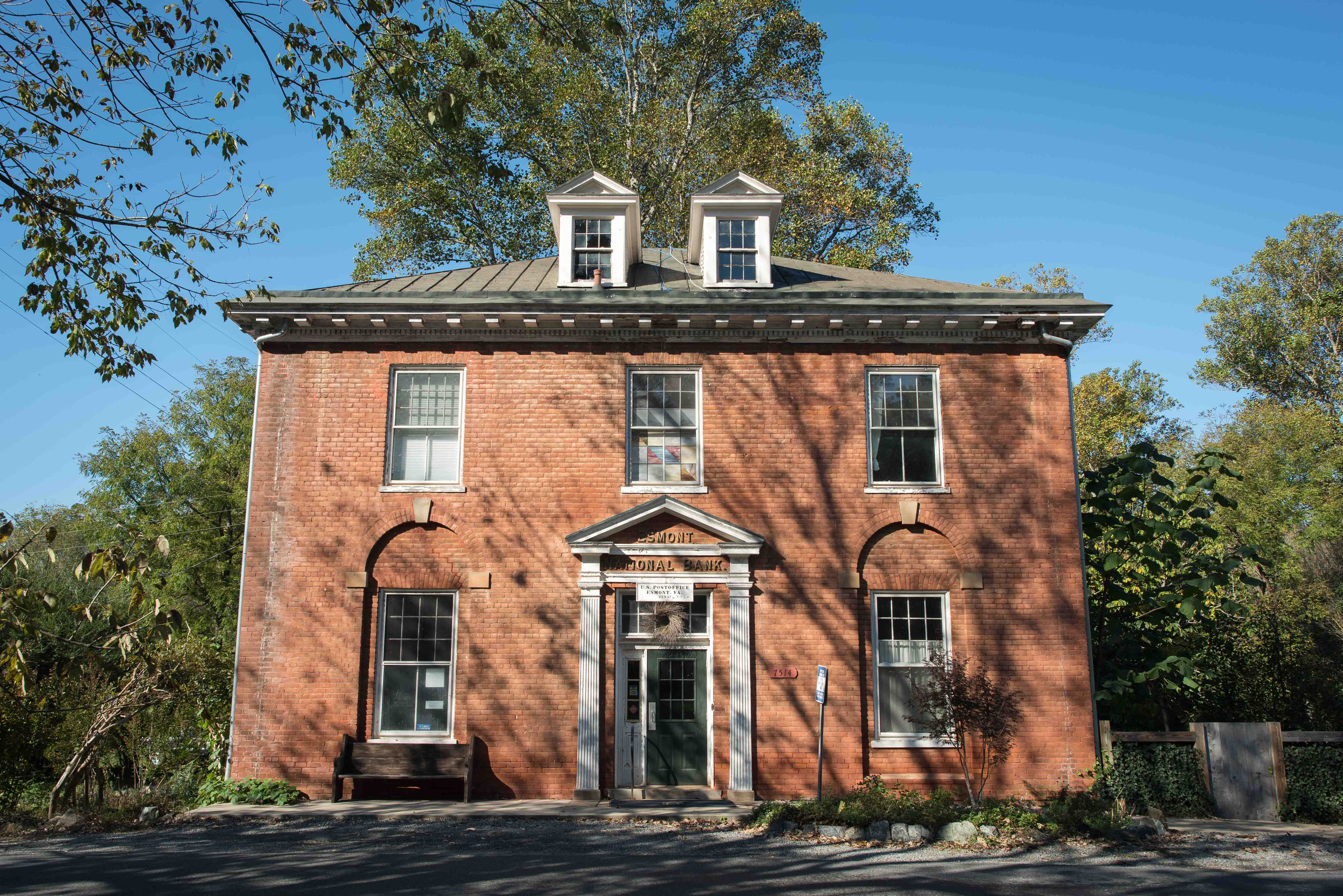
- Former Esmont National Bank, currently U.S. post office

- Location of the Esmont CDP within the Albemarle county

- Location within the Commonwealth of Virginia Esmont (the United States)
- Coordinates: 37°49′53″N 78°36′26″W
- Country: United States
- State: Virginia
- County: Albemarle
- Time zone: UTC−5 (Eastern (EST))
  - Summer (DST): UTC−4 (EDT)
- GNIS feature ID: 1494219

Esmont is a census-designated place (CDP) in Albemarle County, Virginia, United States. The population as of the 2020 Census was 491.

Esmont, Guthrie Hall, and Mountain Grove are listed the National Register of Historic Places.

== History ==
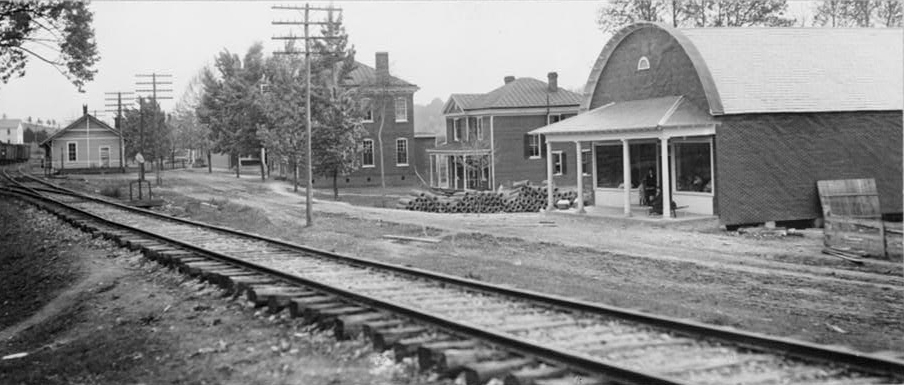
Esmont, 1910, at the railroad tracks

The town was built from land purchased from the former Esmont plantation estate, built by Dr. Charles Cocke, and for which the town was named. Having rich soil, the town has historically been a farming community with a predominantly African American population. The area has been populated since the eighteenth century, though it did not acquire a post office until the later nineteenth century. Slate quarrying began near Esmont in 1883, and by the mid 1920s, the 6000 acre was the nation's largest soapstone producer. The quarry operation stopped in the 1960s due to environmental concerns. At its peak, Esmont had a depot for the Chesapeake and Ohio Railway, three stores, St. Steven's Episcopal Church (built of wood in 1914 and still in operation) and a bank (now converted into a post office). It has recently been the focus of an oral history project by the Carter Woodson institute.

New Hope Baptist is a historically Black church in Esmont. In 1974, the pastor was Rev. H. J. Scruggs, Jr.

In 1974, Esmont also boasted a Greencroft Garden Club.

== Demographics ==
Historical population
Census	Pop.	Note	%±
2020	491		—
U.S. Decennial Census; 2010 2020

Esmont was first listed as a census designated place in the 2010 U.S. census.
