= Robert Franklin Leedy =

Lawyer, soldier and legislator

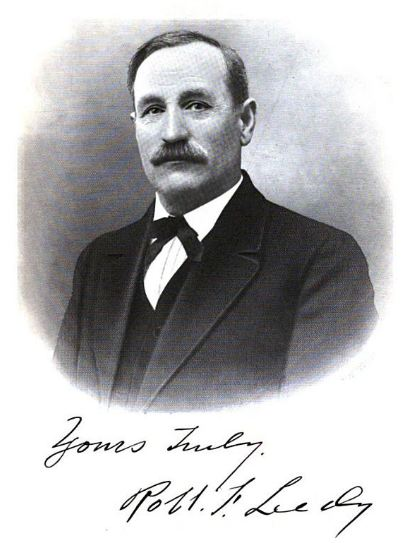
- Born: 28 July 1863; Rockingham County, Virginia
- Died: 12 January 1924; Luray, Virginia, U.S.
- Education: University of Virginia
- Occupations: Lawyer, Soldier, Legislator
- Political party: Democrat
- Spouse: Emma C. Keister
- Children: 7

Robert Franklin Leedy (28 July 1863 – 12 January 1924) was a lawyer, soldier, and Virginia state legislator.

== Early life and education ==
Robert Franklin Leedy was born at Leedy's Pump, Rockingham County, Virginia, a son of John (1826–1889) and Sarah Ann Mauck Leedy (1830–1896). At the time of R.F. Leedy's birth, his father was on detailed service from the Confederate army to conduct farming operations. John Leedy served one year in the 10th Virginia Infantry before being detailed to this service. Like his father, Robert was initially a farmer, working on the family farm until the age of 22. He received a basic education in the common schools of his county of birth.

== Career ==
After leaving home at the age of 22, Leedy spent the next three years mining and railroading. He returned to the family farm when he was about 25. On 27 March 1890, Leedy married Emma Cathrine Keister, a daughter of Martin and Elizabeth Keister. Shortly after marrying, the new couple relocated to Basic City, Virginia. He engaged in a variety activities there, including real estate and mercantile pursuits, and he began to read law under D.S. Henkle, and in the offices of Floyd Wise Weaver and John B. Minor. Eventually entering the summer law school at the University of Virginia, Leedy was admitted to the bar in Augusta County, Virginia in September 1893.

In the midst of his legal education, Leedy was elected mayor of Basic City. Reelected in 1894, Leedy resigned a year later and moved to Luray, Virginia. A junior partner in the law firm of Weaver (Floyd Wise Weaver) and Leedy, he left the firm in 1899 to practice alone. In 1908, he partnered with Richard F. Berry and T.L. Benson to create the firm of Leedy and Berry. During his legal career, Leedy was particularly known for work on several cases pertaining to railroad damage suits.

In 1914, Leedy was elected as a member of the Virginia House of Delegates in the Virginia General Assembly. Representing Page County, Virginia and Rappahannock County, Virginia, he held his seat for two terms.

== Military service ==
A successful lawyer, Leedy was also regularly involved in military matters, serving with the Virginia Volunteers (National Guard) for many years. In September 1902, he was made a captain of the "Page Rifles," which was an unassigned militia company in Luray until mustered in as Company C of the 2nd Virginia Regiment, Virginia National Guard. Leedy quickly rose in the regiment, being promoted to lieutenant colonel in June 1905 and full colonel by August of the same year. In June 1916, the 2nd Regiment was one of a number called up from the National Guard in a Border support role in support of the Pancho Villa Expedition. He continued to command the regiment during its nine-month stay near the Mexican border, at Brownsville, Texas. Not long after the regiment returned to Virginia, it was called up again for service when the United States committed to participation in the First World War. When the regiment was sent to Camp McClellan, Alabama in preparation for shipment overseas as part of the American Expeditionary Force, it was combined with the 1st and 4th Virginia as the 116th Regiment, subsequently becoming part of the 29th Infantry Division. Though he planned to continue to command the regiment after the consolidation, Leedy failed rigorous physical tests and was relieved of command.

== Late career ==
Leedy returned to Luray in March 1918 and was elected the following fall as an unopposed Democrat to the Senate of Virginia, representing Page, Warren, and Clarke counties. During this time, Leedy continued to be a strong advocate for the National Guard and he collaborated with James Hay in the development of the Hay Army Bill, giving new status to the National Guard. Leedy was also known, during his time in the Senate of Virginia in 1920, for his strong opposition to prohibition and Women's Suffrage.

In that same year, Leedy unsuccessfully made a bid for the United States House of Representatives, running against Thomas W. Harrison, of Winchester, Virginia, for Virginia's 7th Congressional District. A major factor in his loss may have been that he ran on an anti-Volstead platform in a dry district. Two years later, despite efforts of his supporters to get him to run again, Leedy opted to support Harrison.

Leedy became very ill in December 1923 and, by January, had developed a case of double pneumonia. He died at his home, "The Maples", in Luray on Saturday, 12 January 1924. He was buried in Green Hill Cemetery in Luray.

== Organizational affiliations ==
Robert F. Leedy was a member of several different organizations including the Lafayette Lodge, No. 137, Ancient Free and Accepted Masons, Luray Chapter No. 19, Royal Arch Masons, Luray Commandery, Knights Templar, and Acca Temple, Ancient Arabic Order of the Nobles of the Mystic Shrine, of Richmond. He was also a member of the Miller-Campbell Post, American Legion in Luray.
