= 111th Field Artillery Battalion =

- Active: 1942–1946
- Country: United States of America
- Branch: Army
- Type: Artillery
- Engagements: World War II: Operation Overlord

Commanders
- Notable commanders: Thornton L. Mullins

The 111th Field Artillery Battalion was an artillery battalion of the United States Army, part of the 29th Infantry Division. The battalion fought in Operation Overlord.

== History ==
=== Origins ===
The 111th Field Artillery Battalion was a unit of the United States army, part of the 29th Infantry Division, based in Norfolk, Virginia, and was made up of members of the National Guard. The battalion was created from the 1st Battalion, 111th Field Artillery when the regiment was broken up on 12 March 1942 as part of an army reorganization that broke up divisional artillery regiments.

=== Operation Overlord ===
The unit took part in Operation Overlord on 6 June 1944, but its members were not happy with their mission. The plan was for them to bring their 105 mm howitzers ashore two hours after the initial landings, to support the 116th infantry unit, which was intended to have secured the beach by then. But the unit's leader, Lt Colonel Mullins, was concerned that the DUKW amphibious vehicles which were their intended transport were not able to bear heavy loads in rough seas. Each DUKW had to carry a howitzer, fourteen men, ammunition, sandbags and other equipment to the beach. Lieutenant Colonel Mullins was killed during the battle.

After the end of the war, the unit returned to the United States and was inactivated at Camp Kilmer on 16 January 1946. The lineage of the unit is perpetuated by the 111th Field Artillery Regiment of the Virginia Army National Guard.
