= 111th Field Artillery Regiment =

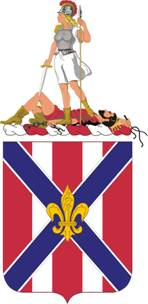
- Coat of arms
- Active: 1809–
- Country: United States of America
- Branch: Virginia Army National Guard
- Nickname: First Virginia Artillery (special designation)
- Motto: NUNQUAM NON PARATUS (Never Unprepared)
- Engagements: American Civil War; Mexican Expedition{1916} Iraq Campaign

Commanders
- Current commander: LTC David P. Coyle

Insignia
- Distinctive unit insignia

The 111th Field Artillery ("First Virginia Artillery") is currently constituted as a composite battalion consisting of two batteries of 105MM towed artillery and one battery of 155MM towed artillery (M777) unit with a general support/reinforcing mission. It is a unit within the Virginia Army National Guard based in Norfolk, Virginia.

== First World War and afterwards ==
The Virginia National Guard's 1st Field Artillery was drafted into Federal service on 5 August 1917. The regiment was reorganized and redesignated 15 September 1917 as the 111th Field Artillery and assigned to the 29th Division. Demobilized 2 June 1919 at Camp Lee, Virginia. Reorganized 25 October 1932 in the Virginia National Guard as the 111th Field Artillery and assigned to the 29th Division; Headquarters federally recognized 26 May 1923 at Norfolk. (Location of headquarters changed 28 August 1939 to Hampton.) The regiment was inducted into Federal service 12 March 1942 and its elements reorganized and redesignated as follows: Headquarters disbanded at Fort George G. Meade, Maryland; 1st and 2d Battalions as the 111th and 227th Field Artillery Battalions, elements of the 29th Infantry Division; (remainder of regiment—hereafter separate lineages).

The 1st Battalion of the 111th FA Regiment, part of the 29th Infantry Division, is based in Norfolk, Virginia, made up of the Virginia National Guard. It took part in the Normandy landings on 6 June 1944, but its members were not happy with their mission. The plan was for them to bring their 105 mm howitzers ashore two hours after the initial landings, to support the 116th Infantry Regiment, which was intended to have secured the beach by then. But the unit's leader, Lt Colonel Mullins, was concerned that the DUKW amphibious vehicles which were their intended transport were not able to bear heavy loads in rough seas. Each DUKW had to carry a howitzer, fourteen men, ammunition, sandbags and other equipment to the beach. Lieutenant Colonel Mullins was killed during the battle.

The 111th Field Artillery Battalion inactivated 16 January 1946 at Camp Kilmer, New Jersey. It was reorganized and Federally recognized 1 November 1946 with headquarters at Norfolk. 227th Field Artillery Battalion inactivated 16 January 1946 at Camp Kilmer, New Jersey. Redesignated 2 July 1946 as the 442d Field Artillery Battalion and relieved from assignment to the 29th Infantry Division. Reorganized and Federally recognized 20 December 1946 with headquarters at Richmond.

The 111th and 442d Field Artillery Battalions were consolidated 1 June 1959 with Headquarters, 111th Field Artillery (reconstituted 25 August 1945 in the Virginia National Guard), the 615th Missile Battalion (organized and Federally recognized 13 September 1954 with headquarters at South Norfolk), the 710th Missile Battalion, and the 129th Antiaircraft Artillery Battalion (organized and Federally recognized 13 December 1956 with headquarters at Norfolk) to form the 111th Artillery, a parent regiment under the Combat Arms Regimental System, to consist of the 1st Howitzer Battalion, an element of the 29th Infantry Division, the 2d Howitzer Battalion, the 3d Automatic Weapons Battalion, and the 4th and 5th Missile Battalions. (2d Howitzer Battalion ordered into active Federal service 15 October 1961 at Richmond; released 9 August 1962 from active Federal service and reverted to state control.) Reorganized 22 March 1963 to consist of the 1st Battalion, an element of the 29th Infantry Division; the 2d Howitzer Battalion, an element of the 29th Infantry Division; the 3d Automatic Weapons Battalion; the 4th Missile Battalion; and the 5th and 6th Howitzer Battalions. Reorganized 1 October 1964 to consist of the 1st Battalion, an element of the 29th Infantry Division; the 2d and 6th Howitzer Battalions; the 3d Automatic Weapons Battalion; the 4th Missile Battalion; and the 5th Howitzer Battalion, an element of the 258th Infantry Brigade.

== Iraq War Operations ==
Bravo Battery was mobilized on 11 October 2004 in support of Operation Iraqi Freedom with MAJ Walter N. Patrick as the battery commander and First Sergeant Martin Steiner as the unit's first sergeant. The unit was reconfigured as a 182-man military police company, received other members of the 2d Battalion, 111th Field Artillery, and moved to Fort Dix for post mobilization training on 14 October 2004.

Bravo Battery completed training 30 days ahead of schedule and arrived in Kuwait at Camp Virginia on 30 December 2004 and moved on to Camp Bucca in Iraq on 7 January 2005. Bravo sent two platoons, led by 1LT Michael Belforti, to Abu Ghraib. Two platoons and the battery headquarters remained at Camp Bucca. While at Camp Bucca, Bravo Battery operated Compounds 1, 2, 3, and 4. The unit was also tasked with detainee transfers between Camp Bucca and northern bases. The platoons at Abu Ghraib also performed detainee operations and participated in the Battle of Abu Ghraib.

Bravo Battery was relieved in place and a battle hand off was completed on 1 December 2005 with the 116th FA, Florida National Guard, and the unit and its men redeployed to Camp Victory South in Kuwait.

While in Iraq, Bravo Battery completed all detainee transfers without loss of life to any detainee or coalition forces. The unit was awarded the Air Force Meritorious Unit Award and has been recommended for the Army's Meritorious Unit Commendation. Fourteen members of Bravo Battery received the Bronze Star in Iraq and the unit completed over 80 theater wide detainee movements without incident.

While in Iraq, the unit initially reported to LTC Tim Houser of the 105th MP Battalion and COL James Brown of the 18th Military Police Brigade. Later they reported to the 785th MP Battalion and the 43d Military Police Brigade commanded by Brigadier General Kevin R. McBride.

The unit was reflagged as an infantry unit upon coming home from Iraq. In April 2009 the regiment's 1st Battalion received 16 new M119 howitzers.
