= John D. Gardner =

United States general (born 1954)

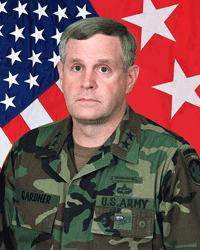
- Lieutenant General John D. Gardner, when holding the rank of Major General
- Born: 27 September 1954 (age 72); Columbus, Ohio, U.S.
- Military career
- Allegiance: United States of America
- Service years: 1976–2012
- Rank: Lieutenant General
- Nickname: Jack
- Unit: United States European Command
- Commands: U.S. Army South; Task Force 134
- Conflicts: Iraq War
- Awards: Defense Distinguished Service Medal; Army Distinguished Service Medal; Defense Superior Service Medal; Legion of Merit (4); Bronze Star Medal; Meritorious Service Medal (6)

John Donovan "Jack" Gardner (born 27 September 1954) is a retired lieutenant general in the United States Army. He is the former deputy commander of the United States European Command in Stuttgart, Germany. During his career he served in Europe, Asia, Latin America, Bosnia, Iraq and numerous locations throughout the United States. He currently serves as the director of the 21st Century Jobskills Project, a nonprofit organization focused on assisting public school students in transitioning to living wage jobs. Gardner is a native of Columbus, Ohio.

== Past assignments ==
=== Deputy Commander MNF-I for detainee operations ===
Gardner was assigned as deputy commander for detainee operations/Commander of Task Force 134, Multinational Force Iraq. His oversight included all detainee operations at Camp Bucca, Camp Cropper, Fort Suse and Abu Ghraib prison as well as operations at Camp Ashraf. Both Fort Suse and Abu Ghraib prison were returned to Iraq control during his tenure.

=== U.S. Army South ===
Gardner was the commander of the United States Army South where he oversaw American military operations in 31 countries and 13 dependencies, in Central and South America and the Caribbean. His operational area of responsibility covered over 15.6 million square miles (40.4 million km^{2}) of area, or one-sixth of the world's surface.

=== Other assignments ===
- Deputy commanding general for transformation, U.S. Army Training and Doctrine Command, Fort Lewis
- Assistant division commander (support), 25th Infantry Division (Light) with duty as deputy commanding general, Multinational Division (North), Stabilization Force-11, Task Force Eagle, Operation Joint Forge, Bosnia
- Assistant deputy chief of staff – United Nations Command/Combined Forces Command/United States Forces Korea Yong San, Korea
- Brigade Commander in the 3d Infantry Division
- Battalion Commander, 1-506th Infantry Battalion, 2nd Infantry Division
- Company Commander of Alpha Company, 1st Battalion, 4th Infantry in Aschaffenburg, Germany.

Gardner retired from active duty in the Army in May 2012.

== Education ==
Gardner is a graduate of West Point in 1976 and the Army Command and General Staff College. In addition Gardner holds a master's degree from Georgetown University, and completed a Senior Service College Fellowship at Harvard University.

=== U.S. decorations and badges ===
- Defense Distinguished Service Medal
- Army Distinguished Service Medal
- Defense Superior Service Medal
- Legion of Merit (with 3 Oak Leaf Clusters)
- Bronze Star Medal
- Meritorious Service Medal (with 5 Oak Leaf Clusters)
- Army Commendation Medal (with Oak Leaf Cluster)
- Army Achievement Medal
- Expert Infantryman Badge
- Senior Parachutist Badge
- Pathfinder Badge
- Ranger Tab

Preceded by MG Alfred Valenzuela	Commander U.S. Army South; 2003-2005	Succeeded by BG Ken Keen
Preceded by MG William H. Brandenburg	Deputy Commanding General (Detainee Operations) / Commanding General Task Force 134; 2005-2007	Succeeded by MG Douglas M. Stone
