= Battle of Abu Ghraib =

Battle in Iraq in 2005

- Part of the Iraqi insurgency
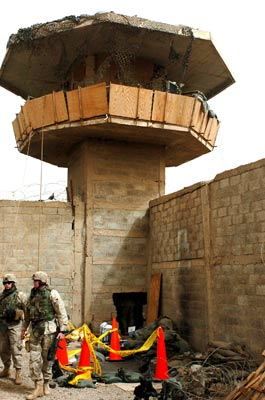
- Damage done to the Abu Ghraib prison during the 2 April 2005 attack.
Date	April 2, 2005
Location	Abu Ghraib, Iraq 33.2925°N 44.0650°E
Result	United States victory

Belligerents
United States	Iraqi insurgents: Al Qaeda in Iraq

Commanders and leaders
	Ammar Hamza Zubaidi

Casualties and losses
44+ wounded	70 killed (US estimate)

The Battle of Abu Ghraib took place between Iraqi Mujahideen and United States forces at Abu Ghraib prison on April 2, 2005.

Mujahideen linked to Al-Qaeda in Iraq launched a surprise attack on the American section of Abu Ghraib prison, known as Camp Redemption, by firing heavy mortars and rockets at the facility, and then assaulting with small arms, grenades, and vehicle-borne improvised explosive devices. The attack was successfully repelled by the US forces after 40 minutes of fighting, resulting in 44 wounded in action and an estimated 70 insurgents killed.

== Background ==
Abu Ghraib prison was a notorious maximum-security prison located in Abu Ghraib, Iraq, 32 kilometers (20 mi) west of Baghdad, known for its use by Saddam Hussein to hold political prisoners who were subject to torture and extrajudicial killing. It was closed by Saddam in 2002, but following his overthrow in the Invasion of Iraq a section of the prison was reopened by the United States, which became an internment camp known as Camp Redemption. Despite Abu Ghraib prison being a fortified stronghold for US forces in the Baghdad area, the scandal made it a prime target for Iraqi insurgents.

By the later half of 2004, violence in Iraq was at a low point, and one of the main insurgent groups making attacks, Al-Qaeda in Iraq, was primarily attacking with suicide bombers and car bombs. An internet posting by Abu Musab al-Zarqawi in December 2004 stated that Abu Ghraib prison was a target for attack.

== Assault ==
At approximately 7:06 p.m. (UTC+3) on April 2, 2005, a large group of insurgents launched an attack on Camp Redemption, with initial thrust of the attack consisting of multiple rockets and mortars aimed at every area of the US facility. The barrage was quickly followed by a vehicle-borne improvised explosive device (VBIED) attacking the northwest section of the outer wall perimeter, but detonated approximately 100 meters from the wall, and was unsuccessful in creating a breach. Observers noted the attack was well-organized and professional and, due to the broad-daylight preparations, it was also called audacious and brazen. The attack surprised the US forces as this was the first time that Al-Qaeda in Iraq had directly assaulted the US military, and soldiers present stated that the insurgents had so much firepower that it seemed that over 300 people were attacking.

The US Marine Corps' Echo Battery 2nd Battalion, 10th Marines, stationed at Abu Ghraib was tasked with perimeter defense of Camp Redemption, engaging the insurgents from the outer wall defensive platforms and managing to slow the momentum of the assault. The main effort of the attack was directed at Tower 4, an outer watchtower located at the southeast corner of the facility, and was subjected to a concerted push by the insurgents. The Marines in the tower received heavy small arms fire and multiple rocket propelled grenades, and several were wounded when hand grenades were thrown from the base of the tower. Two soldiers positioned themselves at the only place the insurgents could enter the tower by rappelling down the wall. Ammunition for the .50 cal machine gun in Tower 4 ran so low that its operators were given orders to fix bayonets in preparation for possible hand-to-hand fighting if insurgents breached into the tower. The Marines evacuated their wounded, including a severely wounded US Navy Corpsman, reinforcing the tower and holding back the insurgents. Meanwhile, a second smaller attack on the other side of the base was used as a feint to distract from the main attack. The prison's defenders were reinforced by the 119th Field Artillery Regiment of the Michigan Army National Guard, the 623rd Field Artillery Regiment of the Kentucky Army National Guard, the 524th Military Intelligence Battalion, the 111th Field Artillery of the Virginia National Guard, 306th Military Police Battalion, the United States Army Reserve, the 732nd Expeditionary Security Forces Squadron of the US Air Force, and the 115th Combat Support Hospital. These soldiers resupplied ammunition, evacuated casualties, resupplied water to entrenched soldiers, and held various defensive positions throughout the base.

During the assault, US units patrolling the area surrounding Abu Ghraib prison were also under attack, including M1A1 Abrams tanks from Charlie Company of the Louisiana National Guard's 1st Battalion, 156th Armor Regiment. Two tanks, C-24 and C-22, were diverted from supporting the prison by a fake improvised explosive device (IED) set on a checkpoint by insurgents. Once the tanks received confirmation that Abu Ghraib prison and the surrounding area was under attack, C-24 and C-22 moved to support the prison, but were engaged by numerous IEDS and rocket propelled grenades. Supporting tank platoons in nearby sectors were hit by VBIEDs and disabled during their push to support C-22 and C-24. None of the Charlie Company tanks were cleared to use their 120mm main guns during the fight, but both engaged targets with .50 cal and 7.62 machine guns.

Inside the detention facility, the 306th Military Police Battalion scrambled to maintain effective security and control over the 3,000 detainees housed in Camp Redemption. Approximately 150 detainees breached one of the compound fence lines, but were successfully contained by a soldier who was then joined by members of the Initial Reaction Force (IRF) within 5 minutes.

The heaviest fighting occurred for a period of two and a half hours. During this time, two US Army AH-64 Apache attack helicopters from 1st Battalion, 3rd Infantry Division (call sign VIPER) arrived on scene to provide close combat attack support. Immediately after crossing west of MSR Tampa the Apaches were caught in a complex ground-to-air ambush by which they fought their way out. The ambush damaged both aircraft. A second set of two Apaches from the same unit came to assist and one was also badly damaged. The four Apaches consolidated at Baghdad International and determined two of the four aircraft were still combat capable and departed to reengage and suppress the enemy throughout the remainder of the night. The fighting continued until approximately 9:45 p.m, when the insurgents were eventually suppressed and forced to retreat. A small number of lighter attacks occurred during the night but were repelled, and the following day a third VBIED disguised as a farm tractor detonated near the walls and two final firefights ensued. The Iraqi National Police discovered that two dead bodies of insurgents were rigged with 120 mm mortar cartridges, and evacuated US personnel from the area. Investigators found more than 100 mortars and rockets and tens of thousands of rounds of ammunition were fired at Camp Redemption by the insurgents. Three tents for detainees were destroyed when rioters set them ablaze with tent poles wrapped in burning rags, but damage to the facility was minor.

== Aftermath ==
=== Casualties ===
No US personnel were reported killed in the battle, but approximately 44 were wounded in action during the fighting, with several seriously injured enough to be helicoptered out of Abu Ghraib by the 128th Medical Company attached to the 115th Field Hospital. 12 prisoners were also wounded. The US estimated 70 insurgents were believed to have been killed in the battle. The remains of a VBIED driver were recovered inside the prison walls, and other remains away from the prison were confirmed by the tankers that were hit by VBIEDs as well.

Several soldiers involved received medals for valor (with "V" device) during the attack, including five members of the 102nd Field Artillery. Command Sergeant Major Michael Donohue, 306th MP BN, was awarded an Army Commendation Medal with a "V" device for valor. Specialist McClellan of the Virginia National Guard, the soldier who contained the prison break, was later awarded the Army Commendation Medal with a "V" device. The Apache pilots also received Air Medals with "V" device.

=== Responsibility ===
Al-Qaeda in Iraq claimed responsibility for the attack, stating that their motivation was the plight of Muslims held at the prison and hoping to free one of Abu Musab al-Zarqawi's commanders detained there. They also intended to intimidate the US forces by demonstrating that no place in Iraq was safe, promising further attacks. Al-Qaeda in Iraq publicly posted a video of the attacks and the preparations. Three days after the battle, a car bomb exploded near the prison, injuring 4 Iraqi civilians.

== Units involved ==
- Echo Battery, 2nd Battalion 10th Marines
- 3rd Battalion 8th Marines
- HHB 1-102nd Field Artillery Rear Area Operations Center (RAOC)
- 2nd Battalion 111th Field Artillery
- 115th Field Hospital
- 128th Medical Company GA Alabama National Guard
- 1st Battalion 119th Field Artillery
- 1st Battalion 156th Armor, Louisiana National Guard
- HHC 306th Military Police Battalion
- Texas Army National Guard 36 Infantry Division
- 1st Battalion 623rd Field Artillery
- HHC 524th Military Intelligence Battalion/JIDC
- HHC 327th Signal Battalion
- 586th Expeditionary Security Forces Squadron (USAF)
- 327th Signal Battalion (Airborne)/50 signal brigade
- Department Of Defense Security Forces, Tactical Response Team
- 1st Battalion, 9th Marines
- Task Force Alcatraz 67th Combat Support Hospital
- Facility Engineer Team 14(-), 416th Theater Engineer Command
- 732nd Expeditionary Security Forces Squadron, USAF
- 108th Military Police Co (Airborne/Air Assault)
