= Douglas M. Stone =

United States Marine Corps general

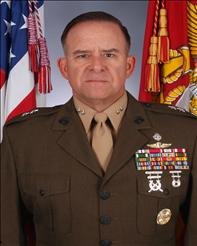
- Major General Douglas M. Stone
- Military career
- Allegiance: United States of America
- Service years: 1973–1978 (USMC); 1978–2008 (USMCR)
- Rank: Major general
- Commands: 2nd Battalion, 23d Marines; MAGTF 4-91; Marine Corps Mobilization Command; Marine Air–Ground Task Force Training Command and Marine Corps Air Ground Combat Center; Task Force 134
- Conflicts: Desert Storm; Iraq War
- Awards: Defense Superior Service Medal; Legion of Merit

Douglas M. Stone is a Major general, United States Marine Corps Reserve, Retired. He relinquished in 2008 the position of Deputy Commanding General, Detainee Operations, Multi-National Force – Iraq and Commander, Task Force 134, commanding all detention operations at Camp Cropper, Camp Bucca and Camp Ashraf. He was nominated for Lieutenant General and was to be head of Marine Forces Reserve and Marine Forces North.

== Military career ==
=== Active duty ===
MG Stone was commissioned a second lieutenant in the Marine Corps after graduating from the United States Naval Academy in 1973. He served on active duty until 1978 holding positions of Weapons Platoon Commander, Company Executive Officer, and Battalion Assistant Operations Officer and Commanding Officer, Company A, Marine Barracks, Guam.

=== Reserve ===
==== Assignments ====
In 1978, MG Stone accepted a reserve commission; and over the years served in the following positions:

- Commanding Officer, Company B, 3d Battalion, 23d Marines
- Commanding Officer, Headquarters Company, 23d Marine Regiment
- Operations Officer 2nd Battalion, 23d Marines
- Battalion Commander 2nd Battalion 23d Marine Regiment
- Deputy Commander, Marine Augmentation Command Element, I Marine Expeditionary Force, Camp Pendleton, California
- Marine Officer in Charge, Executive Support Center, Office of the Secretary of Defense (Joint Staff)
- Commanding General, Marine Corps Mobilization Command
- Deputy Commanding General, Marine Corps Combat Development Command (Mob)
- Commanding General, Marine Air Ground Task Force Training Command and Marine Corps Air Ground Combat Center

Most recently Stone commanded detention facilities in Iraq, where his reforms were widely admired. Stone changed the structure of the detention, to more quickly expedite the release of captives who weren't enemies, or whose ties to the militants had been based on money, not ideology. In addition Stone changed how those held in detention were treated, allowing them visits from their family, and meaningful job skills training.

In April 2009 General David Petraeus called upon Stone to apply his successful experience from Iraq to study the USA's policy on detaining captives apprehended in Afghanistan. His 700-page report was finished in August 2009, and Stone briefed senior officials including: Secretary of State Hillary Clinton, Richard Holbrooke (President Barack Obama's Special Envoy for the region), and General Stanley McChrystal, commander of U.S. forces in Afghanistan. National Public Radio reports that while his report has not yet been made public officials briefed by him say he recommends releasing most Afghan captives, many of whom were not militants, just individuals rounded up in random sweeps. He is also reported to have recommended that those the USA does detain receive the same kind of rehabilitation the captives whose detention he supervised in Iraq received.

According to Radio Free Europe, Amnesty International's Asia-Pacific director, Sam Zia Zarifi, paraphrased Stone's report on the USA's detentions in Afghanistan: "pointed out that the lack of a legal structure for Bagram means that it is undermining the rule of law in Afghanistan and it has caused a lot of resentment among Afghans."

==== Activations ====
Prior to being activated for Operation Iraqi Freedom, MG Stone had been activated once previously. He was activated and served with the 2nd Battalion, 23rd Marine Regiment in support of Operation Desert Shield and Operation Desert Storm. The Battalion, as part of its deployment to Okinawa was sent to Japan as MAGTF 4-91 supporting contingency and humanitarian relief operations in the Western Pacific. From May 2003 to August 2004 he served as the U.S. Defense Representative (and CENTCOM Liaison Officer) in Islamabad, Pakistan.

=== Special positions ===
MG Stone has served on the USMC Reserve Policy Board, the board of directors for the Toys for Tots Foundation, and on the Board of Advisors to the Naval Postgraduate School.

=== Awards and honors ===

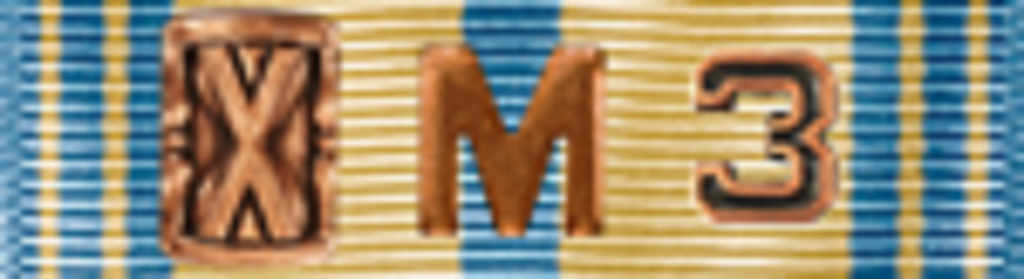

Scuba diver insignia
Navy and Marine Corps Parachutist pnsignia
Defense Superior Service Medal	Legion of Merit	Defense Meritorious Service Medal	Meritorious Service Medal
Navy and Marine Corps Commendation Medal w/ 1 gold award star	Joint Service Achievement Medal	Joint Meritorious Unit Award w/ 1 oak leaf cluster	Navy Unit Commendation
Navy Meritorious Unit Commendation	Selected Marine Corps Reserve Medal with two service stars	National Defense Service Medal w/ 2 service stars	Vietnam Service Medal w/ service star
Global War on Terrorism Expeditionary Medal	Global War on Terrorism Service Medal	Korea Defense Service Medal	Humanitarian Service Medal
Military Outstanding Volunteer Service Medal	Navy Sea Service Deployment Ribbon	Navy & Marine Corps Overseas Service Ribbon	Armed Forces Reserve Medal w/ Gold Hourglass Device, Mobilization Device and award numeral ?
Office of the Secretary of Defense Identification Badge

- MajGen Stone was an honor graduate at Army Ranger School. He also holds several awards of the Rifle and Pistol Expert badges.

== Civilian career ==
Following his distinguished military career and shortly after retirement, Dr. Stone founded STAC Solutions, a Service-Disabled Veteran-Owned Small Business (SDVOSB) in October 2012. STAC Solutions provides Security, Telecommunications, Analytic, and Computing (STAC) Solutions primarily to the US Government. The company has projects providing services directly and through top tier federal integrators to the Legislative Branch, Department of State, Department of Homeland Security, and consults for the United Nations and the US Department of Defense. STAC has expanded its customer base and offerings since its inception and has enjoyed continual revenue growth.

== Education ==
In addition to earning his Bachelor of Science degree from the United States Naval Academy, he earned advanced degrees from Pepperdine University, Stanford University and the Naval War College. He earned a doctorate in Public Administration from the University of Southern California.

== See also ==
Unknown

Preceded by LTG [ John D. Gardner	Deputy Commanding General (Detainee Operations) / Commanding General Task Force 134; 2007-2008	Succeeded by Rear Adm Garland Wright
