= Fort Suse =

Fort Suse
- Sulaymaniyah, Kurdistan Region in Iraq

Site information
- Owner: Ministry of Defence
- Operator: United States Army

Location
- Shown within Iraq
- Coordinates: 35.763175°N 45.138161°E

Site history
- Built: 2005
- In use: 2005-2006

Fort Suse is an Iraqi military installation located in the Kurdistan region of Iraq in the vicinity of Al-Sulamaniya. It was built in 1977 by Russian engineers as a barracks and training facility, but now serves as a prison.

== Use as a detention facility ==
In 2005, the fort was converted from a once United Nations demining facility to a detention facility capable of holding 1,700–2,000 security detainees at a cost of $8 million. The conversion was done using civilian contractors under the supervision of the 20th Engineer Brigade, 82nd Airborne Division Military Police, 101st Airborne Brigade Troops Battalion, and Task Force 134. Task Force 134 is in charge of all Multi-National Force Iraq (MNF-I) detention operations in Iraq. Conversion of the fort to a detention facility, coupled with the expansion of existing facilities at Camp Bucca and Camp Cropper was part of a plan to alleviate over crowding at existing facilities, close the detention facility at Abu Ghraib and to eventually transition detention operations to the Iraqi government.

Construction began on August 3, 2005 and the facility received its first 50 detainees on October 24, 2005.

The facility was initially manned by 1st Battalion, 504th Infantry Regiment, 82nd Airborne Division with detainee operations supervised by members of the 82nd Military Police Battalion, and medics from the 101st Airborne. Facility detainee operations were conducted in conjunction with Kurdish prison guards which obtained extensive training via the 1/504 PIR. In January 2006, 508th Military Police Battalion (Internment/Resettlement) took control over Theater Internment Facility (TIF) operations. Soldiers from the 508th trained up navy personnel to perform guard force duties and detainee operations. In February 2006, members of the Navy Provisional Detainee Battalion (NPDB) began detainee operations. 508th Military Police Battalion (I/R) opened a training program for Kurdish prison guards. Kurdish guards first graduated from the extensive training given by 508th MPs, and later integrated into operating independently on each cell block. 508th MPs maintained control of the TIF operations, while NPDB controlled FOB operations.

On December 12, 2005, Nearly 90 percent of all eligible security detainees in Multi-National Forces-Iraq Theater Internment Facilities, including those at Fort Suse, participated in the democratic vote on the Iraqi National Ballot.

On May 8, 2006, the U.S. armed forces announced that five security detainees had escaped from Fort Suse, the first escape from that facility. Reports blamed the escape on negligence on the part of Kurdish guards. All five detainees were later recaptured by in a joint operation by Kurdish security forces and peshmerga militiamen. (Only four detainees were recaptured, the last was suspected to have died while in the Kurdish mountains.)

In August 2006, it was reported that all security detainees from Fort Suse would be transferred to Camp Cropper and Camp Bucca and the facility turned over to the Iraqi government on September 22, 2006.

== Iraqi run prison ==
After its handover in September 2006, Fort Suse became an Iraqi run prison with a maximum capacity of 1,500 inmates. It received its first inmates on November 19, 2006 and now holds convicted criminals, serving their sentence after being convicted in Iraqi courts.

In October 2007, the International Committee of the Red Cross (ICRC) conducted a visit of Fort Suse, the first visit for that organization of an Iraqi run prison facility. (Note: ICRC visited Fort Suse in early 2006 while 508th MP BN (I/R) was still in charge of the TIF)
