= 586th Expeditionary Security Forces Squadron =

- Active: 2 March 2005 – 22 December 2008
- Branch: United States Air Force Security Forces
- Role: Expeditionary Combat
- Garrison/HQ: Camp Bucca
- Nickname: Bucca's Bastards
- Engagements: Operation Iraqi Freedom

The 586th Expeditionary Security Forces Squadron (ESFS) was a United States Air Force Security Forces Squadron that served in combat as an "In Lieu Of" request for forces agreement between the United States Air Force and the United States Army. The 586th was one of the most decorated Security Forces Squadrons during the Iraq War for its time, serving from 2 March 2005 to 22 December 2008. The 586th became the first combat Security Forces unit to lose a member during the Global War on Terror when A1C Elizabeth Jacobson was killed in action 28 September 2005 near Safwan, Iraq.

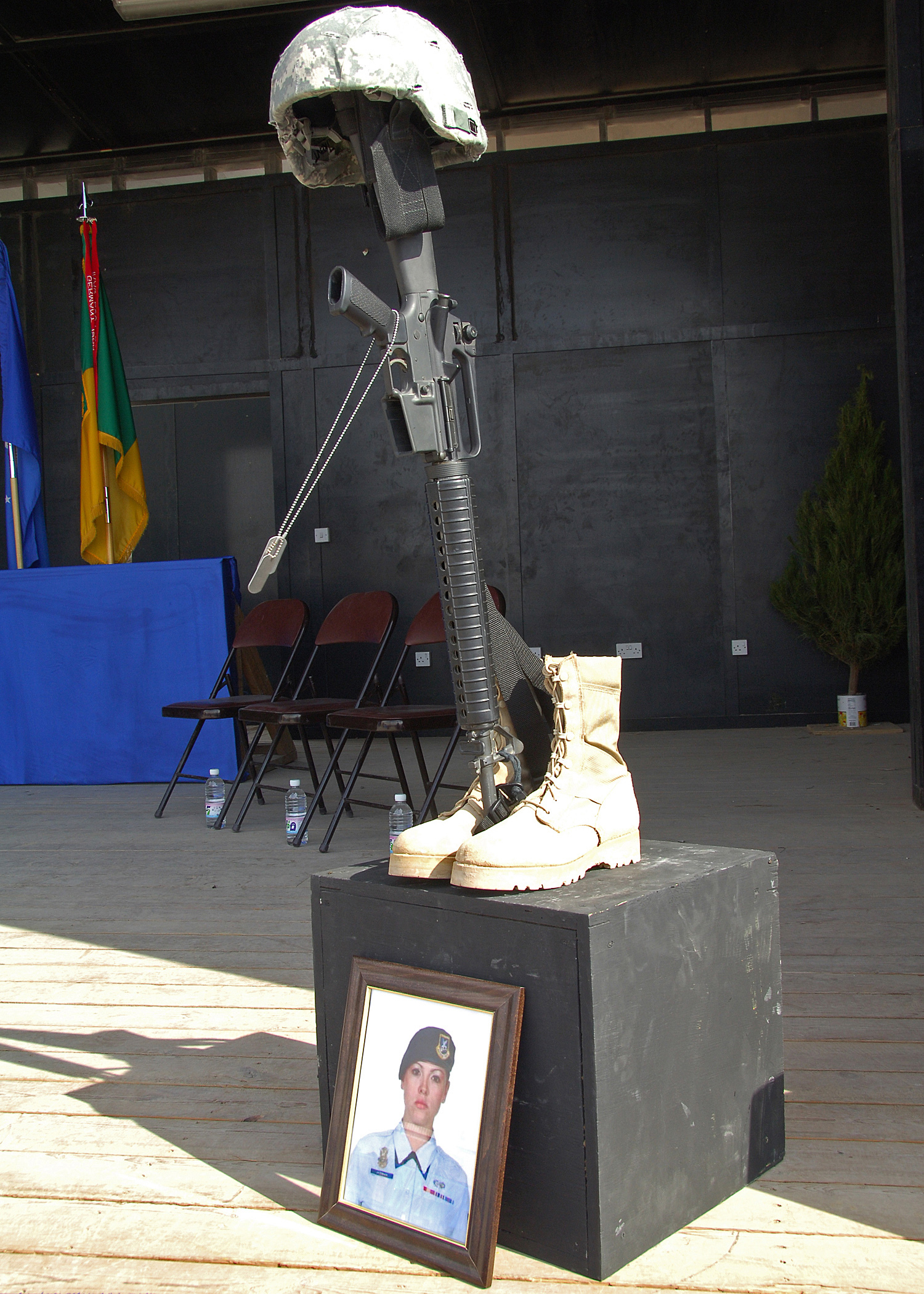
Memorial for A1C Elizabeth Jacobson at Camp Bucca.

== Mission ==
During its activation, the 586th ESFS mission involved providing force protection, conducting exterior patrols and running IED sweeps out of Camp Bucca. The L&O detachment provided Law Enforcement to Camp Bucca, and when the 886th ESFS merged with the 586th on 3 May 2008, that detachment continued to perform the detainee visitation operations. Due to the many roles it took on, the 586th were given the moniker "Bucca's Bastards".

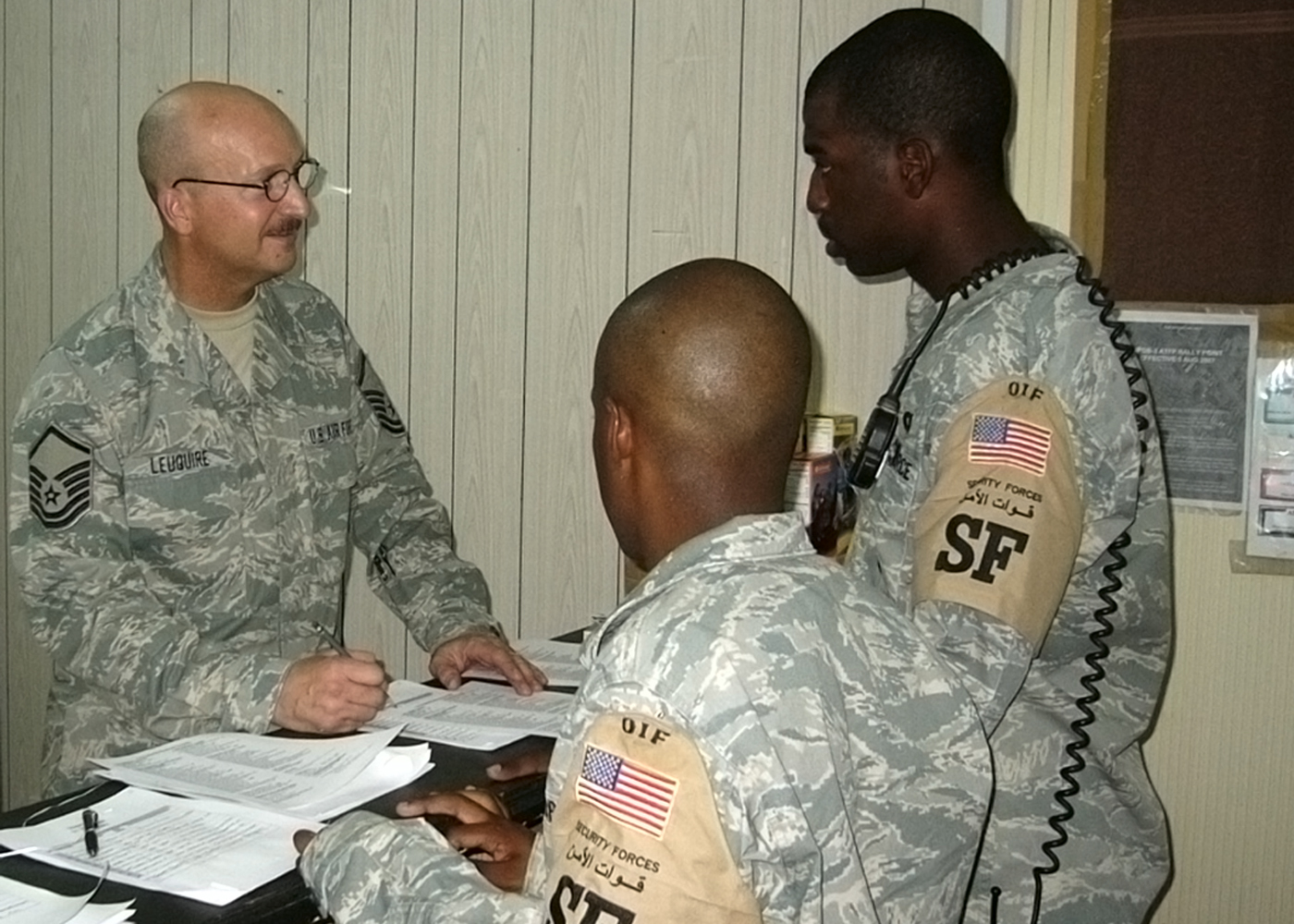
Airmen from the 586th ESFS L&O flight.

== Organization ==
Although the 586th ESFS belonged to the 586th Air Expeditionary Group until its deactivation, its members often operated as members of, or embedded with US Marine Corps and US Army units, performing duties traditionally assigned to such units including:

- 42nd Military Police Brigade
- 1-179th Infantry Battalion, 45th Infantry Brigade Combat Team
- 2-113th Infantry Battalion, 50th Infantry Brigade Combat Team
- 26th MEU SOC Command Element
- Fox Company, BN Landing Team, 2nd Battalion, 8th Marines
- Golf Company, BN Landing Team, 2nd Battalion, 8th Marines
