= Alfred Valenzuela =

United States Army general

Alfred A. Valenzuela
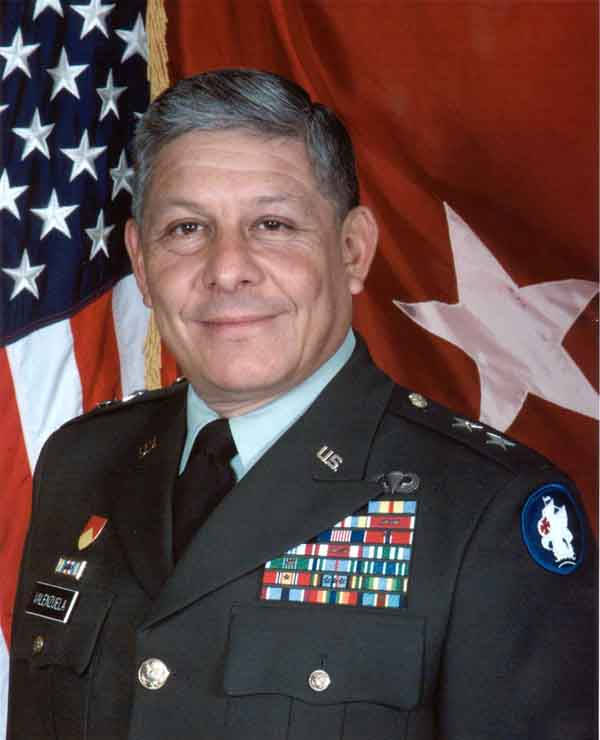
- Maj. Gen. Alfred A. Valenzuela
- Born: 1948 (age 77–78); San Antonio, Texas, U.S.
- Spouse: Esther Valenzuela
- Relatives: 2 children
- Military career
- Branch: United States Army
- Rank: Major General
- Commands: United States Army South Military Group, Peru; Division Artillery 10th Mountain Division; 1-36th Battalion, 17th FA Brigade, VII Corp. Commanded several Artillery Batteries in the 1st Cavalry Division.

Alfred A. Valenzuela is a retired United States Army major general who commanded United States Army South (USARSO) at Fort Buchanan, Puerto Rico and San Antonio, Texas. He also served as Deputy Commanding General (DCINC) of U.S. Southern Command.

Valenzuela was deployed as part of 3rd Infantry Division to Kuwait on operations in 1997.

== Awards and decorations ==
His decorations include the Defense Distinguished Service Medal, Army Distinguished Service Medal, Defense Superior Service Medal, Legion of Merit (with three Oak Leaf Clusters), Soldier's Medal for Heroism, Bronze Star with "V" device, Defense Meritorious Service Medal, Meritorious Service Medal (with two Oak Leaf Clusters), Joint Service Commendation Medal, Army Commendation Medal (with Oak Leaf Cluster), Joint Service Achievement Medal, Army Achievement Medal, Armed Forces Expeditionary Medal, Humanitarian Service Medal and the Joint Meritorious Unit Award (3rd award).

- Defense Distinguished Service Medal
- Army Distinguished Service Medal
- Defense Superior Service Medal
- Legion of Merit with three oak leaf clusters
- Soldier's Medal for Heroism.
- Bronze Star with Valor Device for Valor in combat.
- Defense Meritorious Service Medal
- Meritorious Service Medal with two oak leaf clusters
- Joint Service Commendation Medal
- Army Commendation Medal with oak leaf cluster
- Joint Service Achievement Medal
- Army Achievement Medal
- Armed Forces Expeditionary Medal
- Humanitarian Service Medal
- Joint Meritorious Unit Award with two oak leaf clusters

Served in Haiti, Colombia, Korea, Peru, Turkey, Germany, Kuwait, Grenada, Puerto Rico, Panama, El Salvador, Somalia & numerous Joint & InterAgency assignments. served in 6 Infantry Divisions & 3 Combat Corps

== Civilian career ==
He is a Senior Consultant for the Center of Terrorism Law at St. Mary's University School of Law.

He wrote the book No Greater Love: The Lives & Times of Hispanic Soldiers with Jason Lemons.

Major contributor to the book entitled " Right Before Our Eyes: Latinos Past, Present & Future"

He is the Senior Military Advisor to the Warrior Defense Project, part of the St. Mary's Law School

He wrote: The Essence and Variation of Soldiers in Politics: A Dimensional Typology of Latin American Leadership and Regimes

He is an Advisor to the Military Health Institute, University of Texas Health Science Center

Recently appointed by the Texas Supreme Court to the Texas Access Judicial Commission: co-chair of Veterans committee

== Personal life ==
Valenzuela is married to Esther Valenzuela and they have two children. Lori Valenzuela is a Justice of the 4th Court of Appeals. Served as Criminal District Court Judge for 10 years & was the co founder of the Veterans Felony Treatment Court. Alfred II is a Senior Program manager in the Edicational arena.

== Other Awards ==
- Eagle Scout
- Hall of Fame: Thomas Jefferson High School
- Distinguished Alumni & Distinguished Board of Trustee Emeriti St. Mary's University
- Hall of Fame of the Boy's & Girls Club of America
- Named "One of the Most 100 Influential Hispanics" by Hispanic Business Magazine.

== Philanthropy and civic engagement ==
Appointed by the US President, He is currently serving as a commissioner for The World War One Centennial Commission. He is serving as the Co-Chair of the Military Advisory Council of America 250. They are the military arm of the U.S. Semiquincentennial Congressional Commission.

Has an Educational Foundation that gives scholarships to Soldiers children that he buried from the Iraq/Afghanistan wars.

== See also ==
Preceded by Unknown	Commander U.S. Army South; 2000-2003	Succeeded by LTG John D. Gardner
