= Lisa Girman =

Lisa Girman is a former Pennsylvania State Police Trooper and former reservist in the United States Army.

Girman served 17 years in the reserves, and rose to the rank of master sergeant.

Girman was given an "other-than-honorable" discharge while serving as a prison guard at Camp Bucca in Iraq. Girman and three other guards are alleged to have beaten Iraqi prisoners in retaliation for the alleged mistreatment of Jessica Lynch.

Girman maintains she is innocent. Girman's case was never brought to a court martial, but instead to a non-judicial punishment hearing, where the convening officer found her guilty of maltreatment of prisoners. She then faced a Separation Board, which gave her an "other than honorable" discharge from the Reserves. Later, the charges were reviewed by the Army Discharge Review Board, and her "other-than-honorable" discharge was reversed.
