= Combat Action Medal =

U.S. Air and Space Forces combat decoration

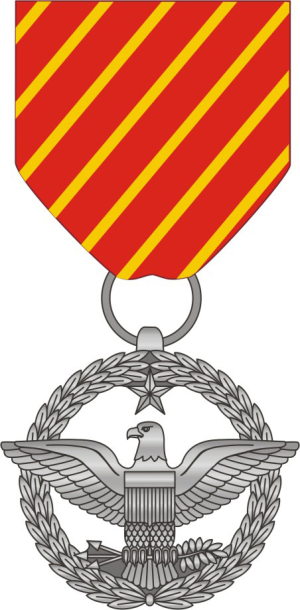
- Combat Action Medal
- Type: Medal (Service/Achievement)
- Awarded for: Active participation in ground or air combat
- Presented by: United States Department of the Air Force
- Eligibility: Airmen and guardians in the grades of E-1 through O-6
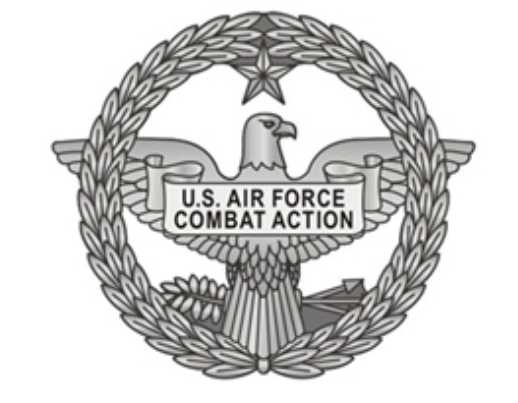
- Reverse
- Status: Currently awarded
- Established: 15 March 2007
- First award: 12 June 2007 (retroactive to 11 September 2001)
- CAM service ribbon

Precedence
- Next (higher): Service achievement medals
- Equivalent: Naval Service: Navy Combat Action Ribbon; Coast Guard: Coast Guard Combat Action Ribbon
- Next (lower): Presidential Unit Citation
- Related: Combat Infantryman Badge (U.S. Army Infantry and Special Forces equivalent); Combat Medical Badge (U.S. Army Medical Department equivalent); Combat Action Badge (U.S. Army other branch equivalent)

The Combat Action Medal (CAM), formerly known as the Air Force Combat Action Medal (AFCAM), is a decoration of the United States Air Force and United States Space Force to recognize airmen and guardians for active participation in ground or air combat.

The CAM was first awarded on June 12, 2007 as the Air Force Combat Action Medal, to six airmen who were engaged in air or ground combat off base in a combat zone during Operation Enduring Freedom (Afghanistan, October 7, 2001 – December 28, 2015) or Operation Iraqi Freedom (Iraq, March 19, 2003 – September 1, 2010). The medal is retroactive from September 11, 2001 forward to a date to be determined and may be awarded posthumously.

On 16 November 2020, the Air Force Combat Action Medal was renamed to the Combat Action Medal by the Secretary of the Air Force.

== Criteria ==
For an airman or guardian to wear the CAM, members must provide proper documentation to their commander which includes a narrative explanation of the airman or guardian's involvement in combat activities to the first O-6 (Colonel) in their operational chain of command on an AF Form 3994. The application will be processed through the chain of command and eventually be approved or disapproved by the Commander of Air Force Forces (COMAFFOR).

Nomination of the award of the CAM will be restricted to members of the U.S. Armed Forces who on or after September 11, 2001, were under any of the following conditions:

- Deliberately go into the enemy's domain (outside the wire) to conduct official duties, either on the ground or in the air, and have come under enemy fire by lethal weapons while performing those duties, and are at risk of grave danger.
- While defending the base (inside/on the wire), and must have come under enemy fire and engage the enemy with direct and lethal fire, and are at risk of grave danger.
- Are personnel in ground operations who actively engage the enemy with direct and lethal fires also may qualify even if no direct fire is taken, as long as there was risk of grave danger and meets other criteria.

Retroactive awards prior to September 11, 2001, are not authorized.

It is worn after the Air and Space Achievement Medal and before the Air Force Presidential Unit Citation.

The CAM may be awarded to members from the other Armed Forces and foreign military members serving in a U.S. Air Force or U.S. Space Force unit, provided they meet the criteria for the award.

=== Ribbon devices ===
According to USAF Memo, June 25, 2015, Air Force Instruction 36–2803, December 18, 2013 (Change 1, June 22, 2015): AFCAM, Authorized Device: A gold star will be worn to recognize subsequent operations when approved by the Chief of Staff of the Air Force (5.3.1.7., pages 148-49). However, in AFI 36-2903, gold stars are not included in the AF list of authorized ribbon devices (11.4, page 224); service/campaign stars (3/16" bronze/silver star) are the only star devices authorized for wear. Also, no ribbon device is authorized for wear in AFI 36-2803 to denote subsequent awards of the CAM, which normally would be oak leaf clusters. The Navy, Marine Corps, and Coast Guard authorizes a 5/16" gold star to denote subsequent awards of specific decorations and a 3/16" bronze service star is worn on the Global War on Terrorism Expeditionary Medal to denote a subsequent operation.

== Medal design ==
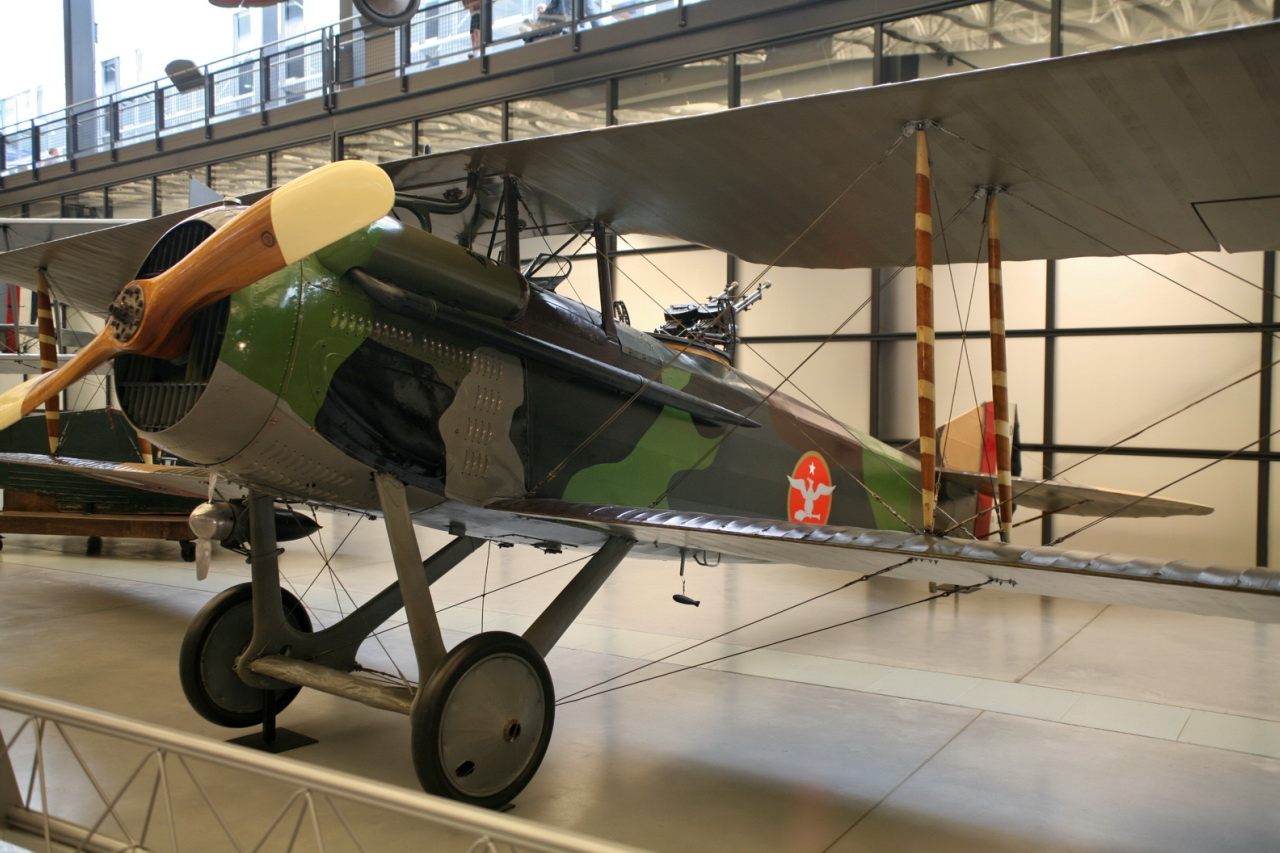
Billy Mitchell's SPAD XVI he flew in World War I with a Lewis twin machine gun mounted in the rear cockpit. The aircraft is now located at the National Air and Space Museum.

In conjunction with the Army Institute of Heraldry, the medal was designed by Susan Gamble, a professional artist and Master Designer for the U.S. Mint, and wife of Mike Gamble, an Air Force colonel. She was quoted by The Washington Post as saying, "It was just a real pleasure to give this back to the Air Force that's been part of my life."

Gamble based the silver medal's design and ribbon color (scarlet with ten yellow stripes) from the circular insignia painted on planes which were piloted by Brigadier General William "Billy" Mitchell, including a French-built SPAD XVI (SPAD 16) fighter aircraft he piloted in France during World War I. His SPAD 16 (single-engine, two-seat, reconnaissance and bomber aircraft) is currently displayed at the Smithsonian National Air and Space Museum in Washington, D.C. Mitchell is generally known as the father of the U.S. Air Force.

A laurel wreath surrounds the medal's eagle emblem executed in a simple, linear Art Deco style. The eagle with a national flag shield with thirteen perpendicular stripes on its breast faces right, over the right talon clutching arrows (represents the power of war), to reflect that this is a combat medal. The left talon clutches an olive branch (represents the power of peace). The eagle which symbolizes Mitchell's military rank insignia of colonel, has above it a five-pointed star which represents Mitchell's wartime promotion to the temporary rank of brigadier general in October, 1918. The reverse side of the medal contains two rows of words written on a scroll at the center of the eagle, "U.S. Air Force" and "Combat Action".

The ribbon's diagonal stripes at first could not be manufactured in the United States; but military medals cannot be manufactured outside the U.S. This design problem was resolved when a mill in Bally, Pennsylvania, Bally Ribbon Mills, bought a new loom specifically to weave the diagonal stripe. A Rhode Island firm, Ira Green Inc. in Providence, made the metal parts. The CAM is the only U.S. military award to have a diagonally patterned ribbon, much like the British Distinguished Flying Cross and Netherlands Airman's Cross. The CAM service ribbon has five stripes.

== Recent Awards ==
=== First award - June 12, 2007 - June 21, 2009 ===
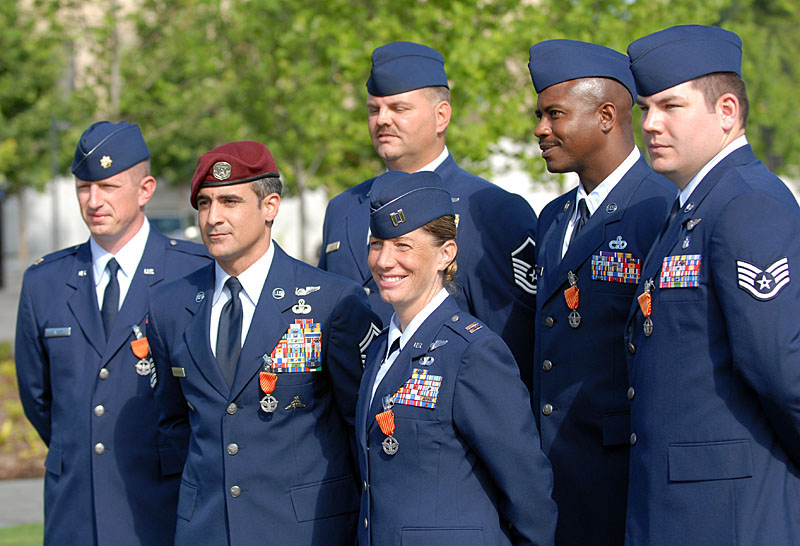
The first Combat Action Medals were awarded to six Airmen on June 12, 2007. (Front row, left to right): Maj. Steven Raspet, Senior Master Sgt. Ramon Colon-Lopez, Capt. Allison Black. Back row, left to right: Master Sgt. Byron Allen, Master Sgt. Charlie Peterson, Staff Sgt. Daniel Paxton.

The CAM was presented for the first time to seven airmen (six men and one woman) by the Air Force Chief of Staff, General T. Michael Moseley (now retired), at the U.S. Air Force Memorial in Arlington, Virginia: and 819 RED HORSE (Airfields Shop) Malmstrom Air Force Base, Montana

- Staff Sgt Thomas Benincosa Layton, Utah for actions in January 2008 at Iraq)
- Maj. Steven A. Raspet of Fountain Valley, California ( for actions on January 8, 2006, at Afghanistan)
- Capt. Allison K. Black of Northport, New York (for actions on December 4, 2001, at Afghanistan)
- Senior Master Sgt. Ramon Colon-Lopez of Bridgeport, Connecticut (for actions on March 11, 2004, at Afghanistan)
- Master Sgt. Charlie Peterson of Detroit, Michigan (for actions on July 28, 2004, at Iraq)
- Master Sgt. Byron P. Allen of Birmingham, Alabama (for actions on April 12, 2004, at Iraq)
- Staff Sgt. Daniel L. Paxton of Abingdon, Virginia (for actions on March 28, 2003, at the Kuwait-Iraq border)
- Senior Airman Alex P. Sekula of Kissimmee, Florida (for actions on June 21 2009, Tarin Kowt-Central Afghanistan) along with his first Purple Heart

=== Awards (posthumous) ===
The CAM was presented posthumously to:

- A1C Elizabeth Jacobson of Riviera Beach, Florida for action on September 28, 2005, at the Kuwait-Iraq border.
- MSgt. John A. Chapman of Springfield, Massachusetts for action on March 4, 2002, during the Battle of Takur Ghar
