= Allison Black =

American military officer

Colonel Allison Black
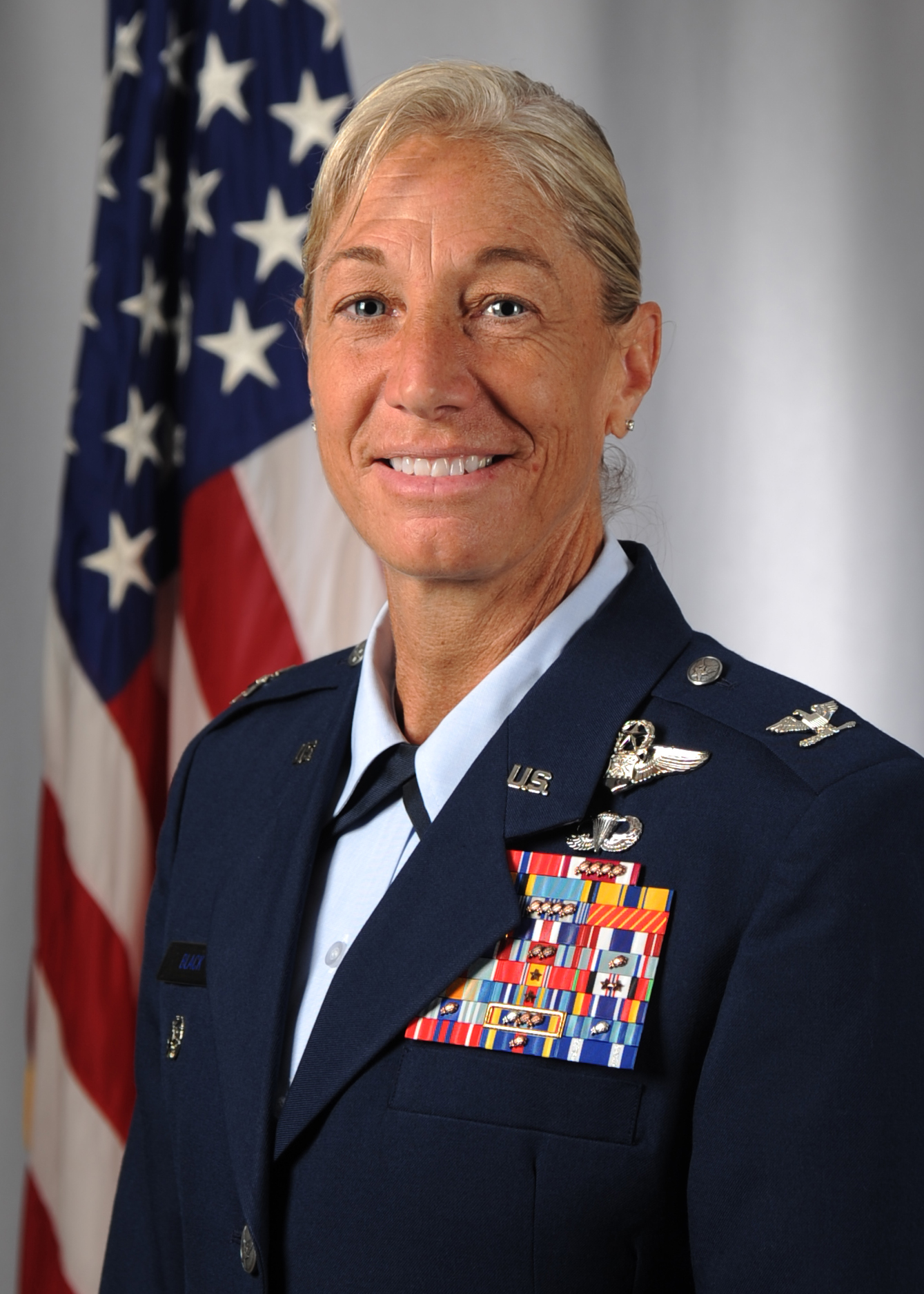
- Black in 2020

Personal details
- Children: 2
- Education: Wayland Baptist University; Air Force Officer Training School; George Mason University; National Defense University

Military service
- Allegiance: United States
- Branch/service: United States Air Force
- Years of service: 1992-2024
- Rank: Colonel
- Battles/wars: War in Afghanistan: Operation Enduring Freedom
- Awards: Achievement Medal; Air Medal; Bronze Star Medal; Combat Action Medal; Combat Readiness Medal; Commendation Medal; Defense Meritorious Service Medal; Meritorious Service Medal; NATO Medal

Colonel Allison K. Black is an American retired military officer. She was given the nickname "Angel of Death" as an AC-130H gunship officer in the United States Air Force during the War in Afghanistan. She was the second woman to ever serve as commander of the 1st Special Operations Wing at Hurlburt Field, from 2022 until her retirement in 2024.

== Military career ==
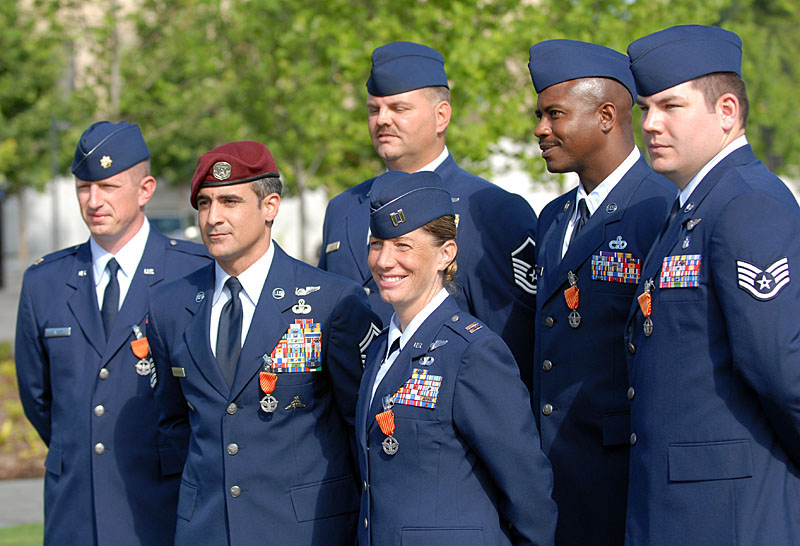
Black (middle) among first six USAF airmen to receive the Air Force Combat Action Medal on June 12, 2007

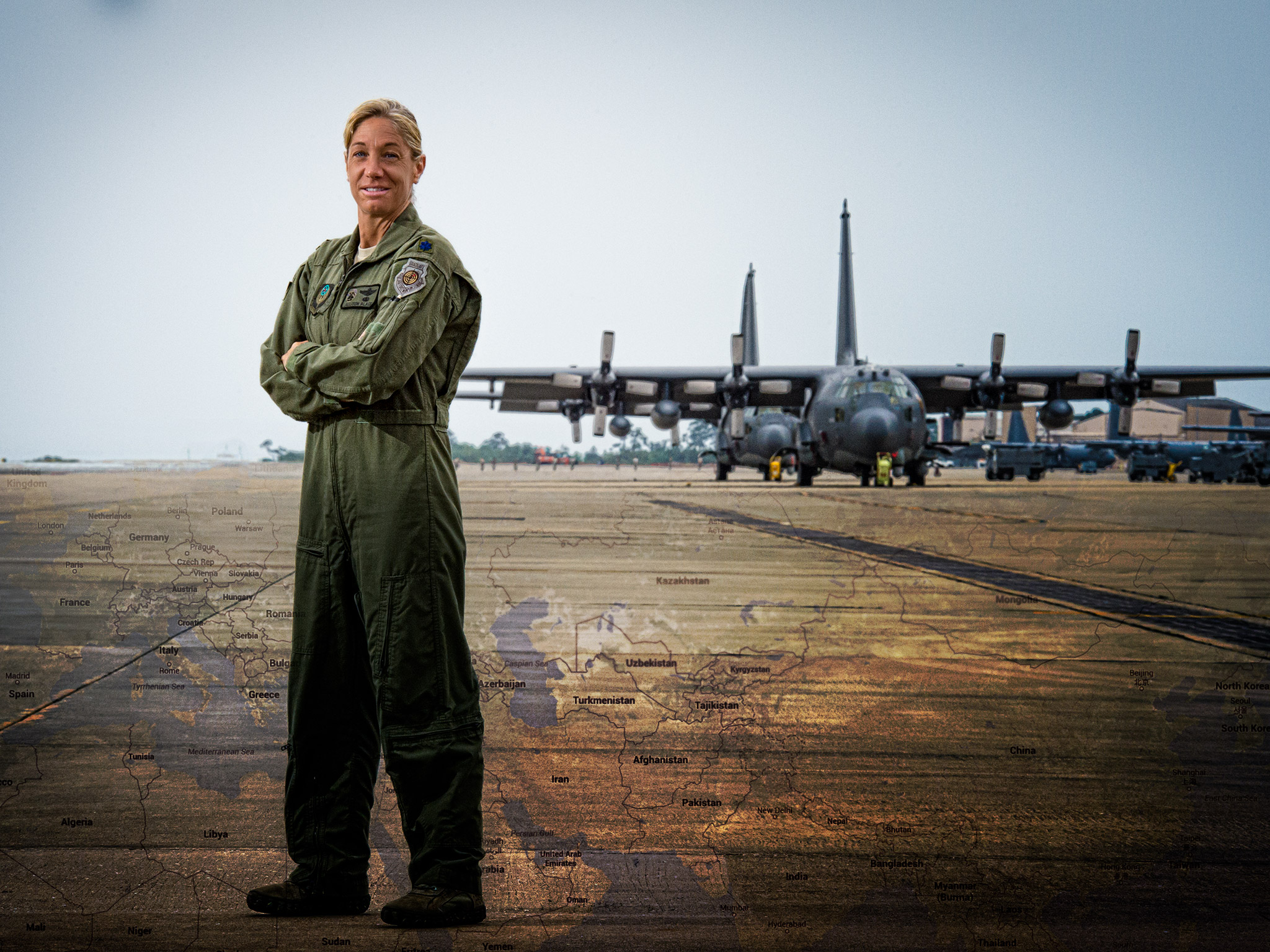
Lt. Col. Allison Black portrayed with an AC-130H behind her overlaid over a map of the Middle East and Central Asia below.

In 1992, Black enlisted in the United States Air Force, serving as a Survival, Evasion, Resistance and Escape specialist for six years. She served as a SERE instructor at Fairchild Air Force Base. In 1998, she obtained her commission from Air Force Officer Training School after earning a bachelor's degree from Wayland Baptist University. She later obtained her navigator wings from Joint Specialized Undergraduate Navigator Training. Black later earned a master's degree in strategic communications from George Mason University and a master's degree in security studies from the National Defense University.

In 2001, she was deployed as part of the initial response to the September 11 attacks during Operation Enduring Freedom. Throughout the War in Afghanistan, she served as an AC-130H gunship officer. She commanded air support that struck Taliban forces. She was given the nickname "Angel of Death". Black was gifted an AK-47 from Abdul Rashid Dostum.

Over the course of her thirty-two years in the air force, Black logged 3,400 flight hours with 2,000 combat hours in the AC-130H Spectre Gunship and U-28A Draco.

In July 2022, she assumed command of the 1st Special Operations Wing at Hurlburt Field in Florida. She retired from the air force on February 23, 2024.

She was the second woman to command the 1st Special Operations Wing, which comprised around 8,600 military and approximately 4,300 civilian personnel at Hurlburt Field.

=== Awards and decorations ===
Black received multiple military awards and decorations, such as the Bronze Star Medal, the Defence Meritorious Service Medal, the Meritorious Service Medal with 3 oak leaf clusters, the Air Medal with 15 oak leaf clusters, the Air Force Achievement Medal with 4 oak leaf clusters, the Air Force Commendation Medal, the Joint Service Achievement Medal, the Air Force Combat Action Medal, the NATO Medal, and the Combat Readiness Medal.

She received the MSgt John A. Chapman Service Before Self Award from the Combat Control Foundation in 2024.

On June 29, 2024, Black was awarded the Margaret Cochran Corbin Award by the Daughters of the American Revolution at the society's 133rd Continental Congress. She was presented the award by DAR President General Pamela Rouse Wright and 1st Vice President General Ginnie Sebastian Storage during National Defense Night ceremony at DAR Constitution Hall in Washington, D.C.

== Personal life ==
Black grew up in East Northport, New York.

She lives in Navarre, Florida with her husband, Ryan, and two sons. Ryan also served as SERE specialist in the Air Force.

Black is an ambassador for the Special Operations Warrior Foundation. On November 11, 2023, she served as the Grand Marshal of the Pensacola Beach Veterans Day Parade.
