= Garland Wright =

Garland P. Wright
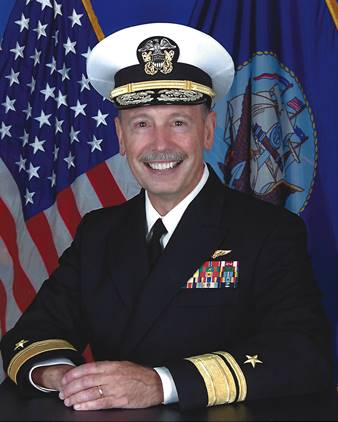
- Rear Admiral Gar Wright, USN
- Born: August 4, 1954 (age 72); Fort Lauderdale, Florida, United States
- Spouse: Mary Wright
- Children: Travis Wright, Stanley Wright
- Military career
- Allegiance: United States of America
- Branch: United States Navy
- Service years: 1977–2012
- Rank: Rear Admiral
- Nickname: Gar
- Units: Multi-National Force-Iraq, TF-134
- Commands: Constellation 0294; Tactical Support Center 1294; Naval Air Station North Island; Force Protection/Law Enforcement Physical Security Unit 0194; Commander, Naval Air Force, United States Pacific Fleet (COMNAVAIRPAC) 1094; Task Force 134
- Conflicts: Iraq War
- Awards: Distinguished Service Medal; Legion of Merit (3); Bronze Star; Meritorious Service Medal; Navy and Marine Corps Commendation Medal (4); Joint Meritorious Unit Award; Navy Achievement Medal (3); Navy Unit Commendation Medal (2)]] Navy Expeditionary Medal; Iraq Campaign Medal

Garland Porter “Gar” Wright Jr. (born August 4, 1954) is a retired Rear Admiral of the United States Navy. His final active duty assignment was as deputy director of the Defense Threat Reduction Agency. He previously served as Commander Joint Task Force 134, and prior to that as Deputy Chief of the Navy Reserve. He is a 1977 graduate of the United States Naval Academy where he was co-captain of Navy's first national championship Sailing team and named an intercollegiate "All American."

== Military career ==
After designation as a Naval Flight Officer (NFO), he joined the Sea Control Squadron (VS) 38 "Red Griffins", completing two Western Pacific deployments aboard USS Constellation (CV-64). His next assignment was with VS-41, where he served as a Fleet Readiness Squadron (FRS) instructor and Tactics Training Department Head, with concurrent duty as the Anti-submarine Warfare Sea Control Wing Pacific (ASWWINGPAC) Tactical Development/Evaluation officer and AIREM/BGAREM exercise officer.

In 1986 he accepted a reserve commission and was assigned to the VS-0294 "Moonlighters", serving sequentially as NFO NATOPS, Training officer, and Maintenance officer. He was reassigned to ASWWINGPAC 0194 as the FRS augment team Officer in Charge (OIC) when VS-0294 was disestablished in 1991.

Rear Adm. Wright's Command tours included: Constellation 0294, Tactical Support Center 1294, Naval Air Station North Island 0194, Force Protection/Law Enforcement Physical Security Unit 0194, and Commander, Naval Air Force, United States Pacific Fleet (COMNAVAIRPAC) 1094. Non-command assignments included serving as Operations Officer for Joint Force Air Component Command (JFACC) 0194, and Operations Officer for Area Air Defense Command Pacific (AADCPAC).

In 1998 he was selected to join an initial cadre of officers to launch the Navy Reserve Officer Leadership Course (OLC). From 1999 to 2002 he served as an adjunct instructor at the Command Leadership School, in Newport, Rhode Island, and in 2000 he was appointed as force-wide director for Navy Reserve Leadership Training.

Rear Adm. Wright's first flag assignment was with United States Third Fleet where he served as the Maritime Operations Center (MOC) Director, and Deputy for Maritime Homeland Defense (MHLD). In this capacity he advised the Commander on the training/certification of surge-ready forces, development of operational plans, and force employment/joint integration options. In August 2007 he was mobilized to Iraq to fill the billet of Deputy Commander, Task Force 134 (Detainee Operations), Multi-National Force Iraq (MNF-I). On June 6, 2008 he succeeded Major General MG Douglas M. Stone to become Commander of Multi-national Force-Iraq, Task Force 134 (Detainee Operations). Wright served in this position until September 2009 when he was assigned as the deputy commander, Navy Region Southwest. Subsequent assignments included service as the Deputy Chief of the Navy Reserve, and then Deputy Director of the Defense Threat Reduction Agency (DTRA).

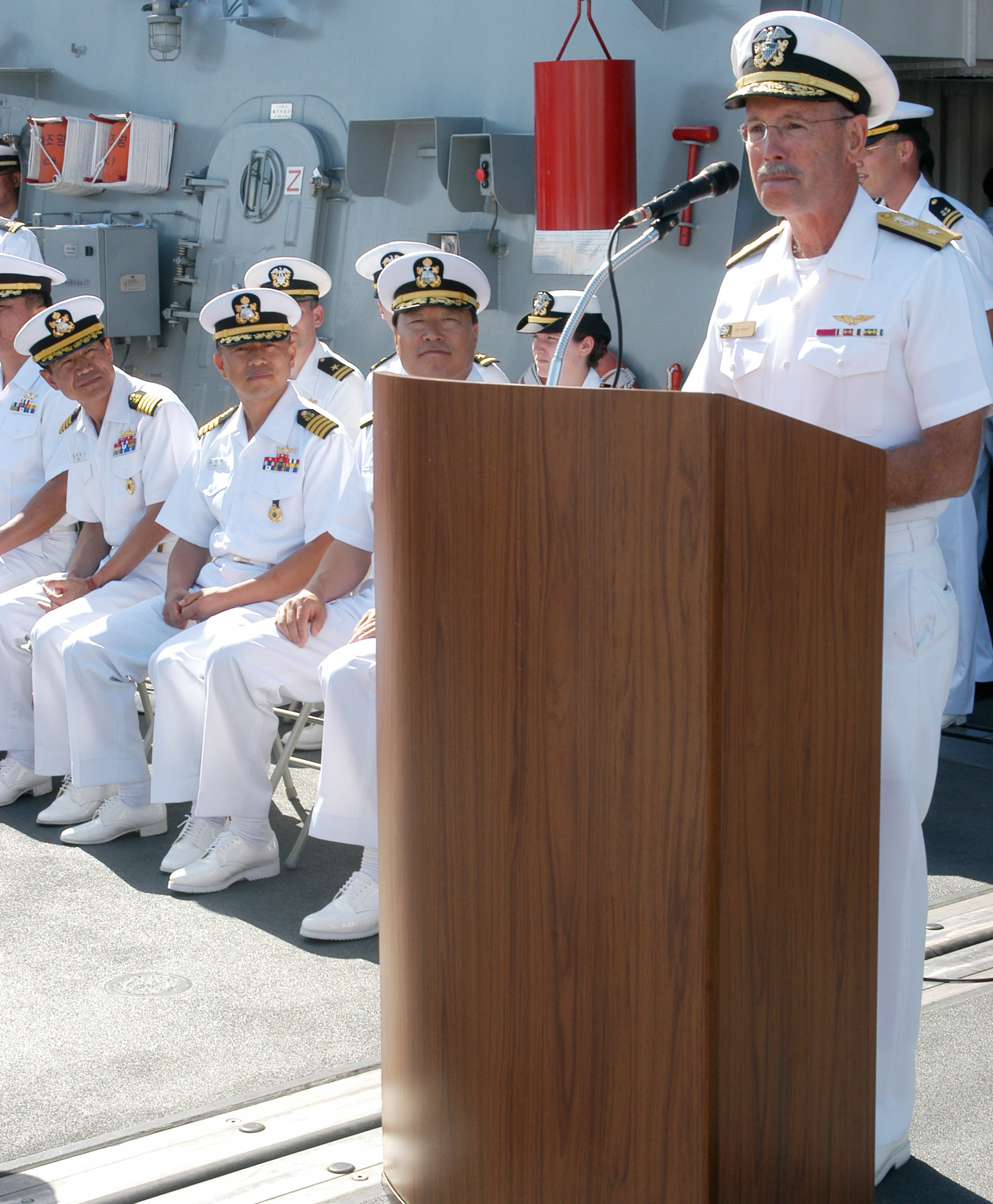
Speaking in 2006

== Awards and decorations ==
Rear Adm. Wright's personal awards include the Distinguished Service Medal, Legion of Merit (3), Bronze Star, Meritorious Service Medal (3), Navy and Marine Corps Commendation Medal (4), Navy Achievement Medal (2), Navy Unit Commendation (2), Joint Meritorious Unit Award, Iraqi Campaign Medal, and other awards.

- Navy Distinguished Service Medal
- Legion of Merit
- Bronze Star
- Meritorious Service Medal with two award stars
- Navy and Marine Corps Commendation Medal with three award stars
- Navy and Marine Corps Achievement Medal with award star
- Joint Meritorious Unit Award
- Navy Unit Commendation
- Iraq Campaign Medal

== Education ==
Wright holds an MBA in Finance from National University and is a graduate of Executive and Reserve Component programs at the Naval War College, Naval Postgraduate School, National Defense University, San Diego State University, and Harvard's John F. Kennedy School of Government.

== Personal ==
Wright married Mary Patricia Ortega in June 1983.

== See also ==
- United States Navy
- Multi-National Force – Iraq
- Defense Threat Reduction Agency
- Iraq War

| Preceded by MG Douglas M. Stone | Deputy Commanding General (Detainee Operations) / Commanding General Task Force 134; 2008-2009 | Succeeded by MG David Quantock |
