= Elizabeth Jacobson =

United States Air Force airman

Elizabeth Nicole Jacobson
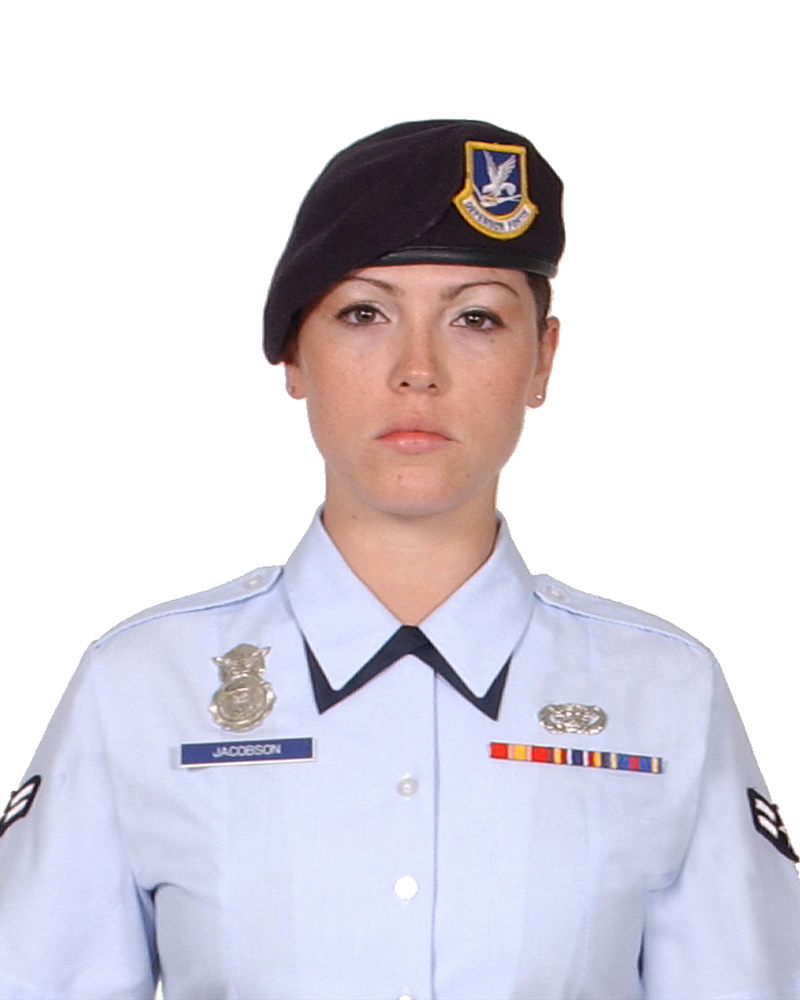
- Born: Elizabeth Nicole Jacobson; March 26, 1984; Orlando, Florida, U.S.
- Died: September 28, 2005 (aged 21); Safwan, Basra Governorate, Iraq
- Burial place: Forest Lawn Memorial Gardens, Pompano Beach, Florida, U.S. 26.258624°N 80.125002°W
- Military career
- Allegiance: United States
- Branch: United States Air Force
- Service years: 2003–2005
- Rank: Airman first class
- Nickname: "Liz" "Cali"
- Units: 17th Security Forces Squadron; 586th Expeditionary Security Forces Squadron
- Conflicts: Iraq War †
- Awards: Bronze Star Medal; Purple Heart Medal; Air Force Combat Action Medal; National Defense Service Medal; Global War on Terrorism Service Medal; Air Force Training Ribbon
- Website: http://airmanjacobson.com/

Elizabeth Nicole "Liz" Jacobson (March 26, 1984 – September 28, 2005) was a United States Air Force airman who was killed in action in the Iraq War in 2005. A member of the U.S. Air Force Security Forces, she was the first female U.S. airman killed in the line of duty in support of Operation Iraqi Freedom and the first Air Force Security Forces member killed in conflict since the Vietnam War.

== Early life and education ==
Jacobson was born and raised in Florida. She resided in the Riviera Beach area and attended Palm Beach Gardens and Gold Coast high schools. Elizabeth lived with her parents, David M Jacobson and Marianne Earhart, in California until she was 15 when she returned to live with her grandparents, Cos Cosimano and Sondra Millman, Riviera Beach, Florida and then joined the Air Force.

== Career ==
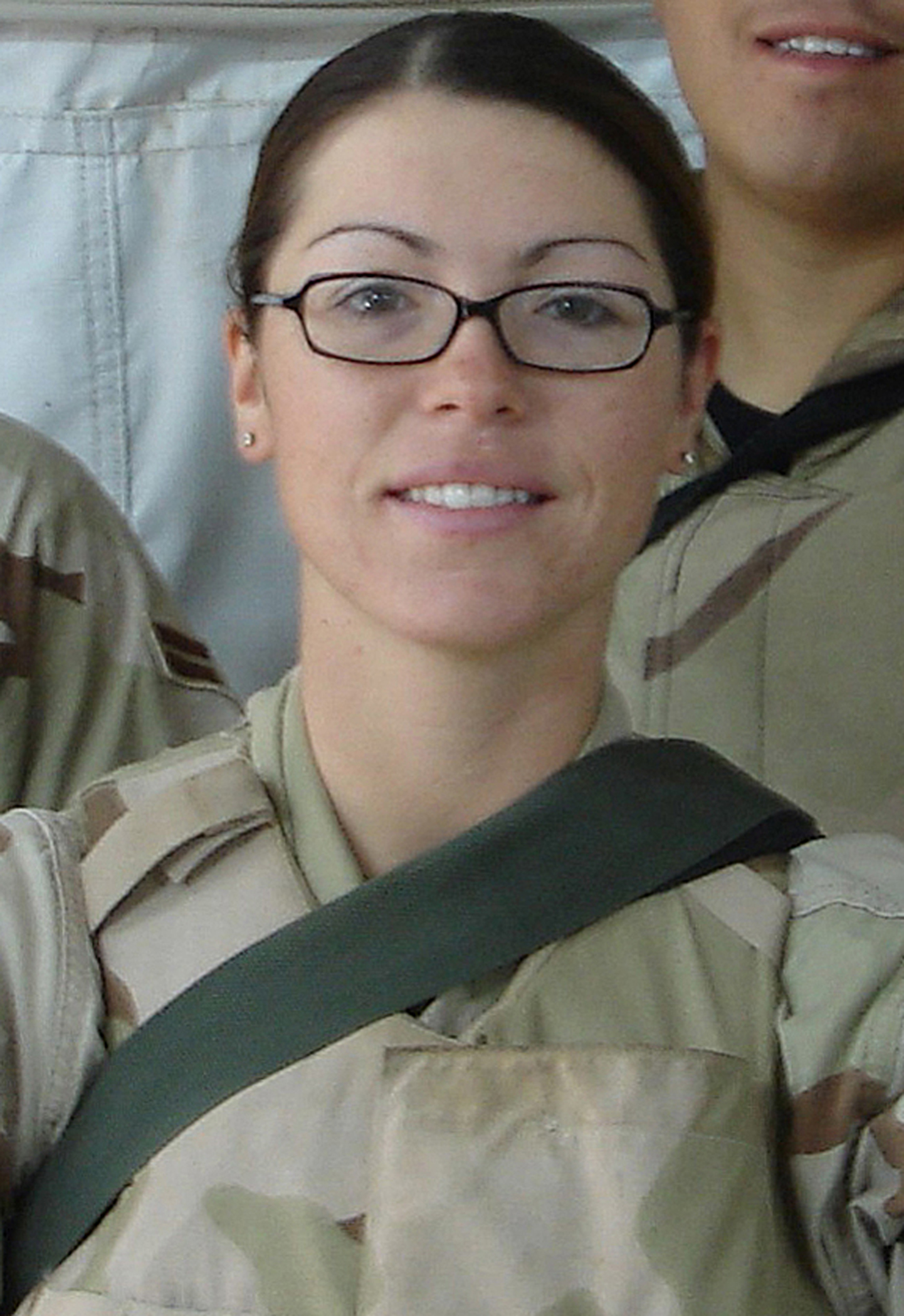
Jacobson (2005)

Jacobson enlisted in 2003, and completed basic military and security forces training in Texas in 2004.

On September 28, 2005, while Jacobson was guarding a convoy originating from Camp Bucca, Iraq, the vehicle she was riding in was hit by an improvised explosive device near the Iraqi town of Safwan. The explosion killed her and U.S. Army sergeant Steve Morin Jr., 34 years old, from Arlington, Texas. A third soldier who was manning the vehicle's turret weapon was injured but survived the attack.

At the time of her death, she was assigned to the 17th Security Forces Squadron at Goodfellow Air Force Base, Texas and deployed to Iraq as part of the 586th Expeditionary Security Forces Squadron. Jacobson had been in the Air Force for two years and was deployed to Iraq for more than three months.

Jacobson is buried at the Forest Lawn Memorial Gardens in Pompano Beach, Florida.

== Legacy ==
The U.S. Air Force has established the Elizabeth N. Jacobson Award for Expeditionary Excellence which is given to airmen for outstanding performance during a deployment. A street on Ali Al Salem Air Base running from entry control point "Echo 4" to the Republic of Korea Air Force (South Korean Air Force) compound was renamed "Jacobson Avenue" in her honor. Goodfellow Air Force Base renamed the base main gate Jacobson Gate. The Eagle Chapter of the Air Force Security Police Association created a challenge coin to honor Jacobson. At Lackland Air Force Base, there is the Jacobson Training Complex for Security Forces members. The library located inside the facility has numerous mementos from Jacobson. The base museum also holds her in a position of honor. The Travis Air Force Base First Term Airman's Center is named after Jacobson.

== Assignments ==
1. 2003 – 2004, 17th Training Wing, Goodfellow Air Force Base, Texas
2. 2004 – 2005, 17th Security Forces Squadron, Goodfellow Air Force Base, Texas
3. 2005 – 2005, Camp Bucca, Iraq

== Awards and decorations ==
Personal decorations
Width-44 scarlet ribbon with width-4 ultramarine blue stripe at center, surrounded by width-1 white stripes. Width-1 white stripes are at the edges.	Bronze Star Medal
Width-44 purple ribbon with width-4 white stripes on the borders	Purple Heart
	Air Force Achievement Medal
	Air Force Combat Action Medal
Unit Awards
	Air Force Outstanding Unit Award
Campaign and service medals
Width=44 scarlet ribbon with a central width-4 golden yellow stripe, flanked by pairs of width-1 scarlet, white, Old Glory blue, and white stripes	National Defense Service Medal
	Iraq Campaign Medal with one bronze Service star
	Global War on Terrorism Service Medal
Service, training, and marksmanship awards
	Air Force Expeditionary Service Ribbon with gold frame
	Air Force Training Ribbon

Other accoutrements
Force Protection Badge
United States Air Force Security Forces Shield
