= 67th Combat Support Hospital (United States) =

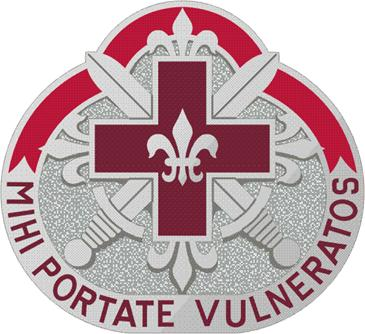
Distinctive unit insignia motto: MIHI PORTATE VULNERATOS (Bring Us Your Wounded)

The 67th Combat Support Hospital was the only forward deployed combat support hospital in Europe with both warfighter support and community service missions. Medical readiness was the primary concern for the unit. Located in the heart of the European theater, the 67th Combat Support Hospital stood ready to provide Echelon III health care around the globe.

== History ==
The 67th Combat Support Hospital was originally constituted as Evacuation Hospital No 67 on 21 July 1924 in the organized reserves and was allocated the VII Corps area.

On 23 March 1925, Evacuation Hospital No. 67 was redesignated as the 67th Evacuation Hospital. Then, on 1 October 1933, the 67th Evacuation Hospital was withdrawn as an organized reserve unit and allocated to the VII Army as a regular Army Unit, inactive. The 67th Evacuation Hospital was activated on 16 March 1942 at Fort Rodman, Massachusetts, and assigned to the first Army.

The 67th Evacuation Hospital was redesignated as the 67th Evacuation, Semi-mobile in February 1943. The unit staged for movement to the European Theater of operations, arriving in Scotland on 29 November 1943, and was reassigned to the First US Army and moved to England. From 30 November 1943 to 16 June 1944 the unit trained at several locations in Gloucestershire, England. On 17 June 1944, the 67th Evacuation Hospital, semi-mobile landed at Utah Beach, Normandy. The unit participated in the Normandy, Northern France, Rhineland, Ardennes Pass-Alsace, and Central Europe campaigns during WWII, and was decorated with the meritorious unit commendation streamer embroidered European Theater.

In December 1945, the 67th Evacuation Hospital, semi-mobile returned to the United States and was inactivated at Camp Kilmer, New Jersey on 1 January 1946. The unit was redesignated as the 67th Evacuation Hospital on 10 June 1963 and activated at Fort Carson, Colorado.

The 67th Evacuation Hospital deployed to Qui Nhon, Vietnam in October 1966, and moved to Pleiku in January 1972. The 67th Evacuation Hospital participated in 15 campaigns during the Vietnam War and was decorated with three meritorious unit commendation streamers embroidered Vietnam 1967–1968 and 1970–1972 and 1972-1973. In March 1973, the 67th Evacuation Hospital was inactivated in Pleiku, Vietnam.

The 67th Evacuation Hospital was again activated on 21 November 1975 in Heidelberg, Germany and was assigned to augment the United States Army Medical Department Activity, Würzburg on the following day. The 67th Evacuation Hospital was officially redesignated the 67th Combat Support Hospital on 16 July 1993. The 67th Combat Support Hospital deployed to the Balkans to support operations in Hungary and Bosnia, from 12 December 1995 to 12 April 1997. It redeployed to Hungary and Bosnia from 8 April 1998 to 8 October 1998 as Task Force 67 and Task Force Med Eagle respectively in support of SFOR.

The 67th Combat Support Hospital deployed a 32-bed expandable to 52 bed Contingency Medical Force (CMF) consisting of 100+ personnel on 3 July 1999 to Camp Bondsteel, Kosovo in support of Task Force Falcon, Operation Joint Guardian II. The CMF was named Task Force MED Falcon and assumed the level III medical mission in Kosovo on 14 July 1999. The 67th CSH returned to Kosovo in 2002 for another 12-month rotation in support of Task Force Medical Falcon that ended in April 2003.

The 67th Combat Support Hospital (minus) deployed in support of Operation Iraqi Freedom (OIF) from January 2004 to January 2005 running split based operations in Mosul and Tikrit. The reason the unit is called "minus" is that the 67th CSH was only the Hospital Unit Base (HUB) of the old 296-bed CSH TOE (HUB and HUS), that was to be rounded out with the Hospital Unit Surgical (HUS) from either the 420th or the 422nd Medical Company from the USAR. Neither of these units were activated to deploy with the 67th CSH. The 67th CSH had requested individual augmentation for low density, high demand AOCs and MOSs, as well as additional equipment in anticipation of the challenges the unit would face in Iraq. All of these requests for augmentation were denied. The Task Force (TF) 67 Headquarters and Company B operated out of Forward Operating Base (FOB) Diamondback, and Company A operating out of FOB Speicher. The 67th CSH shipped all of the organic CSH equipment to include its vehicles in preparation for the evolving mission set. Shortly after arriving in the unit reception area the 67th CSH was directed to prepare to occupy and staff the 26-bed hospitals at Tikrit and Mosul, as well as to provide the base element for the Baghdad Central Detention Facility(Abu Ghraib), augmented by the 848th Forward Surgical Team (FST) and individual medical personnel augmentees from other 2nd Medical Brigade Units. TF 67 initial fell under the command and control of the 30th Medical Brigade who had deployed from Heidelberg, Germany, in support of OIF 1. Shortly after TF 67 assumed its deployment mission in Iraq the 30th Medical Brigade was replaced by the Army Reserve 2nd Medical Brigade. The 2nd Medical Brigade was replaced about nine months later by the 44th Medical Brigade based out of Fort Bragg. TF 67 was replaced in Iraq by the Army Reserve's 228th Combat Support Hospital based out of Texas. TF 67 CSH received the Meritorious Unit Commendation (MUC) for its exceptional medical services provided during its deployment to Iraq for Operation Iraqi Freedom for the period 5 JAN 2004 to 15 DEC 2004. The hospital and its Soldiers served during two campaigns while on this deployment: Transition of Iraq: May 2, 2003 – June 28, 2004; and Iraqi Governance: June 29, 2004 – December 15, 2005.

Upon redeployment to Germany, Soldiers with minimal time left on their tour in Germany were directed not to return to their prior positions in the Wurzburg MEDDAC. This created a manpower shortage in the MEDDAC as the Army Reserve unit that had eventually back-filled for the deployed 67th CSH Soldiers had already departed and there was very little preparation for The Joint Commission (TJC) survey that was to occur in MAY 2005. Those CSH Soldiers who went back into the MEDDAC provided as much assistance as they could in preparation for TJC survey, but overall the WMEDDAC was not set up for success.

The 67th Combat Support Hospital was inactivated at Würzburg, Germany on 19 October 2007 as part of the drawdown of US Forces in Germany.

== See also ==
- List of former United States Army medical units

== Sources ==
- Retreat ceremony circa 1966
- wuerzburg.healthcare.hqusareur.army.mil
- history.amedd.army.mil
