= Navy Provisional Detainee Battalion 2 =

Navy Provisional Detainee Battalion TWO
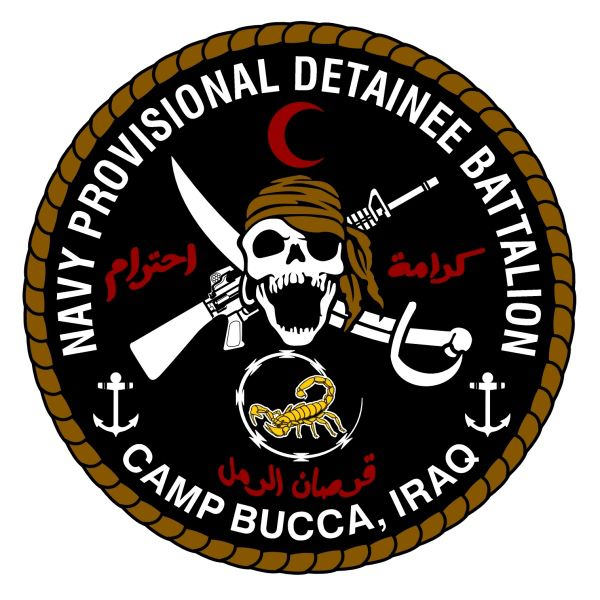
- Coat of arms
- Active: 2006-2007
- Country: United States
- Branch: United States Navy
- Type: Detainee Ops/Combat - Ground Units
- Size: Battalion
- Garrison/HQ: Norfolk, Virginia
- Nickname: Sand Pirates
- Motto: "!!"
- Engagements: Iraq Campaign
- Decorations: Navy Unit Commendation Meritorious Unit Commendation

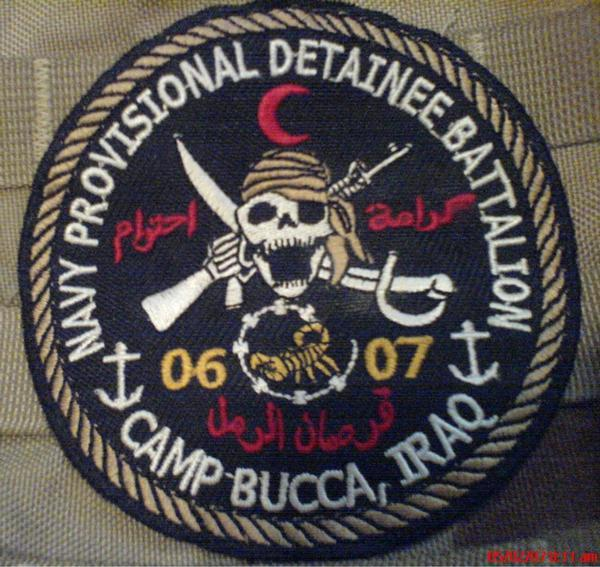
Navy Provisional Detainee Battalion 2

Navy Provisional Detainee Battalion 2 (NPDB2) is a United States Navy task force of 422 active duty and Naval Reserve Sailors formed on 1 May 2006 for the purpose of combat duties in Iraq.

== Overview ==
NPDB 2 was formed under the Individual Augmentation Program, that trains US Navy members from all Navy communities (aviation, submariners, surface, hospital corps) to fill manpower shortages for in theater assignments in the US led Global War On Terrorism (GWOT). The sailors were all "individual augmentees -- sailors who fill a non-traditional expeditionary combat support or combat service mission".

Prior to deploying in August 2006, they received three months of training from the Army at Fort Bliss, Texas which included convoy operations, self-defense tactics, riot control, hand-to-hand combat, non-lethal weapons, first aid, search and seizure, and urban operations.

NPDB2 sailors served in Iraq at Camp Bucca under the command of the US Army's 16th Military Police Brigade. During its deployment one sailor was awarded the Purple Heart for injuries in combat, and another died as a result of a self-inflicted gunshot wound to the head. Additionally, two sailors received battlefield promotions through the Combat Meritorious Advancement Program for their achievements during the deployment.

NPDB2 was awarded the Navy Unit Commendation for extremely meritorious service during Operation Iraqi Freedom from 01-May-2006 to 01-Jun-2007.

== Extended deployment ==
In 26 March 2007 Commander of NPDB 2 announced that personnel serving with the battalion, were being involuntarily extended as per a request by the Commanding General Task Force 134 for 3 months making it a total of 15 months deployed. Subsequently making the detainee battalion the longest "boots on ground" Navy unit since World War II. This news came to the sailors just 35 days prior to the units scheduled departure from Camp Bucca. The unit was redeployed to Naval Station Norfolk on 10 August 2007.
