= 785th Military Police Battalion =

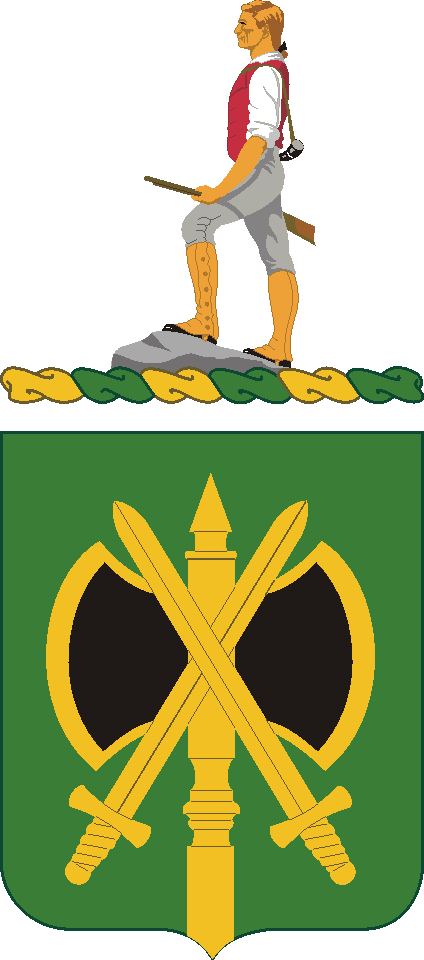
- 785th Military Police Battalion coat of arms
- Active: 1942–1946; 1948–1951; 1953–
- Country: United States
- Branch: Army Reserve
- Type: Military Police
- Role: Internment/Resettlement
- Size: Battalion
- Part of: 300th Military Police Brigade
- Battalion Headquarters: Fraser, Michigan
- Motto: SAFEGUARD AND SECURE
- Engagements: World War II

Insignia
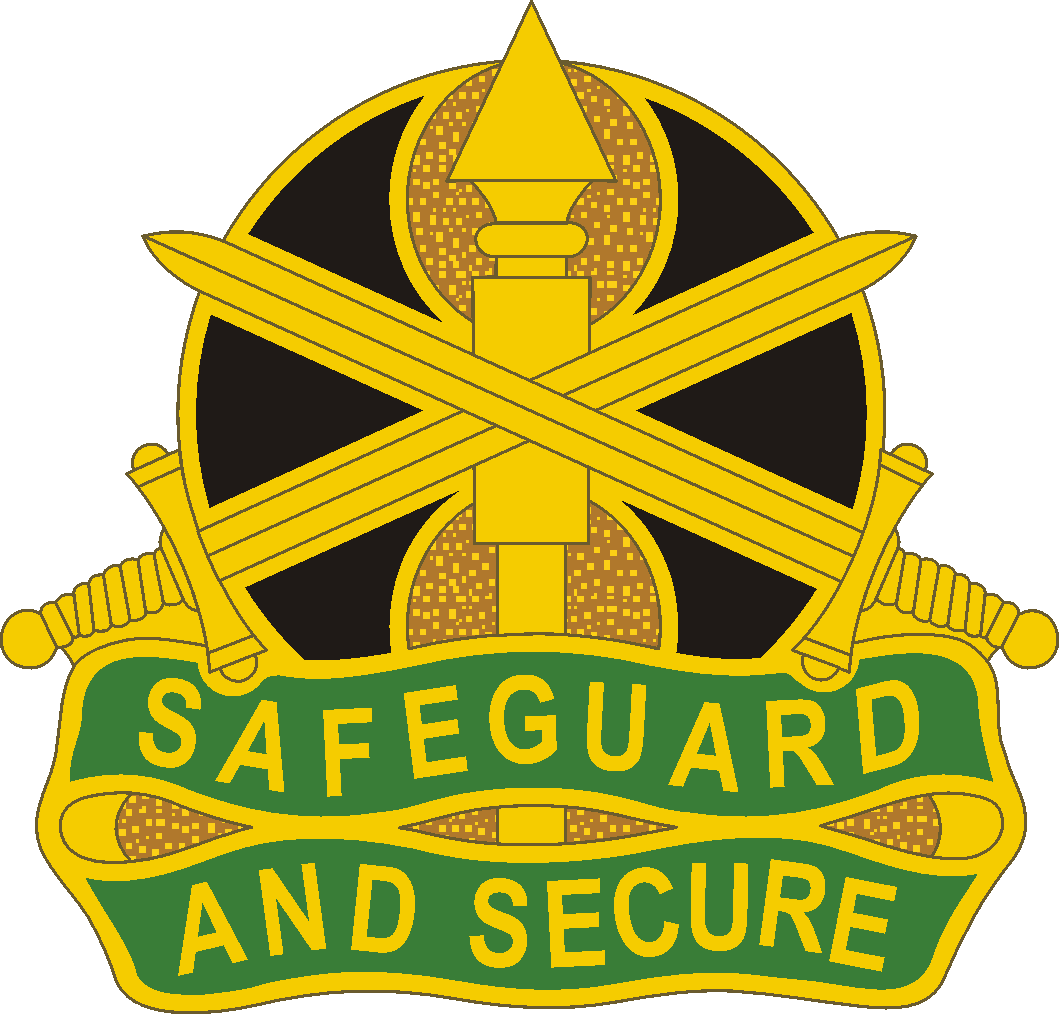
- Distinctive Unit Insignia

The 785th Military Police Battalion (I/R) is an Army Reserve unit whose mission is to provide command, planning, administration, and logistical support for the operation of an internment/resettlement facility. It is located in Fraser, Michigan.

== Battalion lineage ==
This information provided by the Army Institute of Heraldry.

- Constituted 12 November 1942 in the Army of the United States as the 785th Military Police Battalion
- Activated 28 November 1942 at Fort Custer, Michigan
- Inactivated 10 December 1946 on Okinawa
- Redesignated 12 February 1948 as the 300th Military Police Battalion and allotted to the Organized Reserves
- Activated 25 February 1948 with headquarters at Chicago, Illinois
- (Organized Reserves redesignated 25 March 1948 as the Organized Reserve Corps; redesignated 9 July 1952 as the Army Reserve)
- Inactivated 30 March 1951 at Chicago, Illinois
- Redesignated 24 June 1953 as the 785th Military Police Battalion
- Headquarters and Headquarters Detachment activated 16 December 1991 at Inkster, Michigan

== Campaign participation credit and honors ==
- World War II
- Rhineland
- Central Europe
- Asiatic-Pacific Theater, Streamer without inscription
- Operation Enduring Freedom (Guantánamo Bay, Cuba) 2002–2003
  - Joint Meritorious Unit Award (Army) 2002–2003
- Operation Iraqi Freedom (Camp Bucca) 2005–2006
  - Meritorious Unit Commendation (Army) 2005–2006
- Operation Enduring Freedom (Camp Sabalu-Harrison) 2011–2012

== Heraldic items ==
=== Coat of arms ===
==== Blazon ====
- Shield: Vert, a double-headed battle-axe Or blades Sable fimbriated of the second, surmounted by two swords saltirewise of the like.
- Crest: That for regiments and separate battalions of the Army Reserve: On a wreath of the colors, Or and Vert, the Lexington Minute Man Proper.
  The Statue of the Minute Man, Captain John Parker (H.H. Kitson, sculptor), stands on the Common in Lexington, Massachusetts.
- Motto: SAFEGUARD AND SECURE.

==== Symbolism ====
- Shield:
1. Green and yellow (gold) are the colors traditionally associated with the Military Police Corps.
2. The battle-axe is a symbol of authority and emphasizes the mission of the Battalion in both peace and war.
3. The swords represent military readiness and commemorate the unit's two campaigns in World War II.
4. Black denotes determination and dependability; gold is for honor and excellence.
- Crest: The crest is that of the U.S. Army Reserve.
- Background: The coat of arms was approved on 1992-07-27.

=== Distinctive unit insignia ===
- Description: A gold color metal and enamel device 1 1/8 inches (2.9 cm) in height overall, consisting of a gold demi-battle-axe with two black blades superimposed by two diagonally crossed gold swords, overall in base two wavy green scrolls, one above the other with the top scroll inscribed "SAFEGUARD" and the bottom scroll inscribed "AND SECURE" in gold letters.
- Symbolism:
1. Green and yellow (gold) are the colors traditionally associated with the Military Police Corps.
2. The battle-axe is a symbol of authority and emphasizes the mission of the Battalion in both peace and war.
3. The swords represent military readiness and commemorate the unit's two campaigns in World War II.
4. Black denotes determination and dependability; gold is for honor and excellence.
- Background: The distinctive unit insignia was approved on 1992-07-02.

== External links (and references) ==
- 1 – Lineage And Honors Information
- 2 – HRC Permanent Order 031-09 dtd 31 January 2007
- Distinctive Unit Insignia information at Army Heraldry
