= 886th Expeditionary Security Forces Squadron =

The 886th Expeditionary Security Forces Squadron is a provisional unit consisting of Security Forces personnel from around the world like the 72d Security Force Squadron, Tinker Air Force Base Oklahoma and the 47th Security Forces Squadron, Laughlin Air Force Base Texas. The 886th Squadron ran the Detainee Visitation Operations for Camp Bucca's theater internment facility, located in the vicinity of Umm Qasr, Iraq.

On 3 May 2008, the 886th Expeditionary Security Forces Squadron was inactivated and was replaced by a detachment of the 586th Expeditionary Security Forces Squadron which continued to perform the visitation mission.
