= Camp Bucca =

American detention facility in Iraq

Camp Bucca
- Umm Qasr, Basra Governorate in Iraq
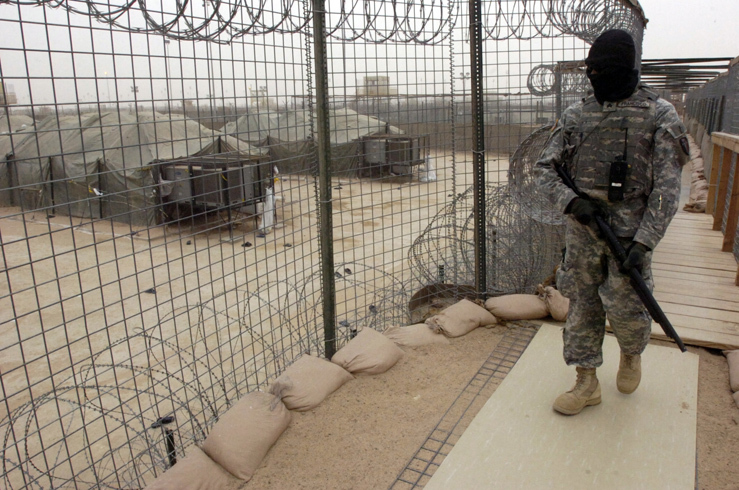
- U.S. soldier patrols along a catwalk at Camp Bucca (2009)

Site information
- Type: Internment Facility
- Owner: Ministry of Defence
- Operator: United States Air Force; United States Army; United States Navy

Location
- Camp Bucca in Iraq
- Coordinates: 30°04′01″N 47°52′29″E

Site history
- Built: 2003; Expansions 2004, 2005, 2007, 2007–2008
- Built by: U.S. Army Engineers, U.S. Air Force Prime BEEF teams Kellogg Brown and Root; United States Army Corps of Engineers; United States Navy Seabees
- In use: 2003–2009
- Battles/wars: Iraq War

Camp Bucca (Arabic: سجن بوكا, romanized: Sijn Būkā) was a forward operating base that housed a theater internment facility maintained by the United States military in the vicinity of Umm Qasr, Iraq. After being taken over by the U.S. military (800th Military Police Brigade) in April 2003, it was renamed after Ronald Bucca, the only New York City fire marshal in history to be killed in the line of duty, during the September 11 attacks. The site where Camp Bucca was built had earlier housed the tallest structure in Iraq, a 492-meter-high TV mast.

After the Abu Ghraib prisoner abuse scandal, many detainees from Abu Ghraib were transferred to Bucca, where U.S. authorities hoped to showcase a model detention facility. Nevertheless, Camp Bucca was the scene of prisoner abuse documented over many years by the Red Cross, Amnesty International, and U.S. Army investigators. It housed numerous prominent Islamic extremists, including a significant portion of the leadership of Al Qaeda in Iraq, and Abu Bakr al-Baghdadi, future leader of the Islamic State (IS), who enjoyed good relations with camp authorities while there. Bucca has been described as a breeding ground for Islamic extremism, and has been cited as contributing to the emergence of IS.

On 17 September 2009, the U.S. military announced that the base would be closed. In December 2010, the U.S. military handed the base to the government of Iraq, who, on the same day, gave Kufan Group of Iraq a license to invest in the new Basra Gateway, to provide a hub for Iraq's port.

== Units ==
- Navy Provisional Detainee Battalion 1
- Navy Provisional Detainee Battalion 2
- 800th Military Police Brigade
- 161st Area Support Medical Battalion
- 670th Military Police Company
- 160th Military Police Battalion
- 190th Military Police Company
- 160th Infantry Regiment
- 178th Infantry Regiment
- 179th Infantry Regiment
- 185th Infantry Regiment
- 586th Expeditionary Security Forces Squadron
- 886th Expeditionary Security Forces Squadron
- 887th Expeditionary Security Forces Squadron
- 168th Military Police Battalion
- 1/172nd Field Artillery Forward
- 15th Combat Support Hospital
- 31st Combat Support Hospital
- HHD, 105th MP Bn

== Significant events ==
=== 2003 ===
On 18 May 2003, U.S. military forces mistakenly released Mohammed Jawad An-Neifus from the Camp Bucca. An-Neifus is suspected of being involved in the mass murder of thousands of Iraqi Shias whose remains were later found at a mass gravesite in the southern city of al-Mahawil.

=== 2004 ===
On 26 January 2004 three detainees escaped at night during a period of intense fog. An investigation "concluded that the detainees crawled under a fence when visibility was only 10–15 meters due to fog".

On 19 October 2004, a 26-year-old security internee died of unknown causes.

=== 2005 ===
On 5 January 2005, a 31-year-old security internee died of what appears to be natural causes.

In April 2005, in Compound 4, a riot broke out in which detainees threw rocks and fashioned weapons out of tent poles. Detainees held a military soldier hostage until the riot was dispelled by the use of lethal force. Four detainees were killed and six were injured. As is standard procedure in all cases of prison riots and the use of lethal force, the matter was investigated by the U.S. Army's Criminal Investigations Division. The investigation concluded that a detainee leader had incited the riot by making an accusation that camp soldiers were stepping on Korans during a search for contraband. No soldiers were found guilty of any wrongdoing during the incident.

On 5 February 2005, the tabloid paper New York Daily News reported that units at Camp Bucca organized and held a mud wrestling party on 30 October 2004. The party was organized by members of the 160th MP Battalion.

On 25 March 2005, a complete escape tunnel was discovered, though no prisoners had yet managed to escape.

On 1 April 2005, two Iraqis and four U.S. prison guards were wounded in a riot at Camp Bucca.

On 15 April 2005, a dispute broke out between two groups of detainees at one of the compounds of the Camp Bucca theater internment facility at approximately 11 pm. The fight left one detainee dead, was confined between the detainees in one compound, and was not directed at U.S. forces.

On 16 April 2005, 11 detainees escaped Camp Bucca by cutting through in the facility's exterior fence and crawling through the unfilled portion of a previously discovered 180-metre (600 ft) escape tunnel.

On 19 April 2005, a 51-year-old male security detainee at Camp Bucca died of natural causes.

On 14 May 2005, a 30-year-old male detainee at Camp Bucca died from a heart attack.

On 27 July 2005, a 30-year-old male security detainee at Camp Bucca died as a result of renal failure and other organ failure due to chronic malaria.

On 28 September 2005, Sergeant Steve Morin Jr. assigned to the 111th Engineer Battalion and Air Force Airman 1st Class Elizabeth N. Jacobson assigned to the 17th Security Forces Squadron stationed at Camp Bucca were killed in action when an improvised explosive device detonated near their convoy vehicle near the Iraqi town of Safwan.

In October 2005, the International Committee of the Red Cross began the Family Visitation Allowance Program at Camp Bucca. The program provides monetary assistance to families of detainees held at Camp Bucca to help cover part of the traveling and hotel costs required to visit the facility. The benefits are calculated based on the distance between their home and the city of Umm Qasr. In December 2006 a similar program was initiated at Camp Shaibe, the British internment facility in Shaibah, near Al Basrah.

On 5 October 2005, a 43-year-old male security detainee died of a heart attack.

On 13 October 2005, eligible detainees at Camp Bucca, Abu Ghraib prison and Camp Cropper were allowed to vote in the Iraqi Constitutional Referendum. The rest of the country voted on 15 October 2005.

On 23 October 2005, a 73-year-old male security detainee died of natural causes at Camp Bucca.

On 25 October 2005, it was reported that Specialist Christopher T. Monroe assigned to the Military Police Battalion stationed at Camp Bucca was killed in a road accident when providing security for a convoy in the vicinity of Al Basrah. The incident resulted in a lawsuit against Erinys International by Monroe's father.

On 5 November 2005, a 65-year-old male security detainee died of natural causes at Camp Bucca.

On 12 December 2005, nearly 90 percent of all eligible security detainees in Multi-National Forces-Iraq Theater Internment Facilities participated in the democratic vote on the Iraqi National Ballot.

=== 2006 ===
On 7 January 2006, Sergeant Nathan Field and Specialist Robert Johnson assigned to the 414th Military Police Company were killed in a non-combat vehicle accident just outside Camp Bucca.

On 7 March 2006, a 36-year-old detainee died of natural causes.

11 May 2006, detainees initiated a multiple compound riot that included the burning of their living quarters, burning a Humvee and assaults on other detainees. The reported cause of the riot was detainees being unhappy that their housing areas were searched and that a Qu'ran with Takferi writing had been placed in a clear evidence bag that the detainees presumed was a trash bag. The riot started around 7 am in compound 10. The initial incident was stopped within an hour but around 11 am the theater internment facility exploded with multiple compound riots. Multiple weapons were found during the initial search, and based on the detainees use of weapons against the guard force, multiple weapons were confiscated during additional searches initiated because of the riot.

On 2 June 2006, the Army opened an Iraqi-based detention center training facility at Fort Leonard Wood, Missouri called Camp Charlie. This new facility is modeled after the theater internment facility at Camp Bucca. A similar facility was opened at Fort Leavenworth in August 2006.

On 1 July 2006, Airman 1st Class Carl Jerome Ware Jr. of the 886th Expeditionary Security Force Squadron assigned to Camp Bucca died of non-combat related injuries. Initial reports stated that the airmen was killed by an accidental discharge of a gun being cleaned by another airman; however in February 2007, it was reported that Airman 1st Class Kyle J. Dalton, of the 15th Security Forces Squadron, Hickam Air Force Base, Hawaii, had been charged on 30 November 2006 with one count of murder and failure to obey a lawful order in relation to the shooting. Dalton also faced a charge of assault for a separate incident that occurred on 30 June 2006 involving Ware and another airman. Dalton, who was deployed in the Middle East at the time the charges were brought, had an Article 32 hearing and was Court-martialed on 23 April 2007 at Langley Air Force Base. As part of a plea bargain deal, Dalton pleaded guilty to involuntary manslaughter and violating a lawful general regulation by drawing or aiming a firearm when deadly force was unnecessary. Dalton was sentenced to 10 years in prison, given a dishonorable discharge, reduced in rank from Senior Airman to Airman Basic and ordered to forfeit all pay and allowances. Dalton admitted to the court that he tracked Ware with his pistol in the barracks and pulled the trigger thinking the weapon was unloaded. He also admitted that he had previously aimed a loaded M4 carbine at another airman.

In July 2006, it was announced that the Army's inspector general had requested an investigation to determine if an Anti-Deficiency Act violation occurred during the building of the detention facility. The Anti-Deficiency Act provides that no one can obligate the Government to make payments for which money has not already been authorized. The inspector general's report was released to Congress on 30 January 2007 and in it concluded: "Army personnel associated with funding of Phases I and II construction of the Internment Facility at Camp Bucca, Iraq, did not implement sufficient controls to ensure military compliance with applicable laws and regulations. As a result, there were two ADA violations with the FY 2004 Army Operation and Maintenance Appropriation. United States Department of Defense Office of General Counsel is completing its review and expects to sign out the report to the Department of Defense Comptroller in the second quarter of FY 2007."

On 12 October 2006, an Iraqi detainee died from a heart attack. The detainee had been hospitalized since 5 October after complaining of chest pains. An autopsy was performed to determine the cause of death.

On 25 November 2006, American forces announced that a detainee died of natural causes. The detainee had been hospitalized since 23 November after complaining of chest pains.

On 24 December 2006, two detainees attempted an escape from one of the U.S. Navy staffed compounds during the dense seasonal fog. One of the detainees was allegedly an improvised explosive device (IED) maker.

=== 2007 ===
On 17 January 2007, U.S. Navy Petty Officer Second Class Joseph D. Alomar, a member of Navy Provisional Detainee Battalion 2, assigned to Camp Bucca died of non-combat related injuries. The sailor is reported to have died from a gunshot wound to the head.

On 11 February 2007 Specialist Dennis L. Sellen Jr. of the 1st Battalion, 185th Infantry Regiment was accidentally shot and killed by a fellow soldier who was cleaning his weapon after a mission. The incident is currently being investigated.

On 2 March 2007 Specialist Christopher D. Young, 20, of Los Angeles, California, died in Safwan, Iraq, of wounds sustained when an improvised explosive device detonated near his vehicle. He was assigned to Company C, 3rd Battalion, 160th Infantry Regiment, California Army National Guard, San Pedro, California.

On 15 March 2007 U.S. military officials announced plans to once again expand Camp Bucca and Camp Cropper. Officials stated that this increase in capacity would be necessary to handle the detainees generated from the increased security operations in Baghdad. At the time of the report, Camp Bucca's detainee population stood at 13,800.

On 26 April 2007, an Iraqi detainee died from what MNF-I reports as injuries sustained during an apparent assault by other detainees. He is reported to have been the sixth detainee to have died in MNF-I TIFs as a result of detainee on detainee violence in the past year.

On 9 June 2007, 6 detainees were killed, 68 wounded and one Iraqi corrections officer was wounded when a rocket struck Compound 8, in the Theater Internment Facility located at Camp Bucca. On 10 June 2007, a seventh detainee, who had been medically evacuated to Balad Air Base, died from wounds he sustained in the attack. On 23 June 2007 an eighth detainee who had been hospitalized in critical condition since the attack, died from cardiac arrest.

On 21 June 2007 a security detainee died of cardiac arrest during a routine medical transfer from Camp Cropper to Camp Bucca.

On 25 June 2007 a soldier assigned to the 178th Infantry was injured when the vehicle he was driving drove over a buried explosive.

On 1 July 2007, a detainee died from what is being reported as natural causes while in the intensive care unit at the Theater Internment Facility hospital at Camp Bucca.

On 12 July 2007, a detainee died from what is being reported as injuries suffered in an assault by other detainees. This is the second detainee in coalition forces custody to die from detainee on detainee violence within a week. On the same day, the Associated Press reported that Camp Bucca was among several sites in Iraq that had sensitive information posted on non-secure web sites. The Camp Bucca documents, posted on the web site of CH2M Hill Companies of Meridian, Colorado, revealed locations of where prisoners are held, locations of fuel tanks, and the locations of security fences, guard towers and other security measures. The company has subsequently added password protection to its site.

In August 2007, two separate news articles reported Camp Bucca's detainee populate stood at approximately 20,000 inmates.

In October 2007, the International Committee of the Red Cross (ICRC) announced it had suspended its visits to Camp Bucca due to the deteriorating security situation in the area. The ICRC visits all detention facilities in Iraq to monitor the conditions detainees are receiving and make recommendations where they perceive improvements could be made. To maintain their neutral status, they refuse coalition security when traveling in Iraq, which causes them to occasionally suspend visits when they deem conditions too hazardous for their personnel.

On 31 October 2007, it was announced that Camp Bucca would be expanded once again to increase its capacity from 20,000 to 30,000 detainees. The $110 million project will be overseen by The U.S. Army Corps of Engineers and would include $17.6 million retrofit of "13 existing compounds to add concrete pads to prevent tunneling, better segregation areas, and better shower and latrine facilities" as well as new housing, a waste water treatment plant, a water treatment plant and a $3.2 million brick factory for prisoner labor.

=== 2008 ===
On January 8, 2008, a QRF squad came under attack and hit by an explosively formed penetrator resulting in 3 coalition WIA and 1 Iraqi WIA. The squad was responding to Umm Qasr to check on a British unit that been attacked by rockets.

On 24 February 2008, Camp Bucca was attacked with rocket fire that killed one Army and Air Force Exchange Service employee and wounded several other civilian contractors. The rocket attack came less than a week after a convoy from Camp Bucca was attacked by an improvised explosive device. No one was seriously injured in that attack.

In August 2008, it was announced that 6 sailors had been charged and would face courts-martial for abusing detainees at Camp Bucca. The abuse allegedly occurred on 14 May and involved beatings of two detainees and the sealing of eight detainees in a cell filled with pepper spray while the cells' ventilation was secured. The abuse apparently occurred after some detainees attacked guards, spitting on them and throwing containers filled with human waste at them. Seven other sailors received non-judicial punishment for failing to report the incidents. Two had their charges dismissed, and the remainder were reduced in rank or faced suspended punishment. In November 2008, the 6 sailors faced an article 32 hearing at Naval Air Station Jacksonville on charges of conspiracy, cruelty and maltreatment and making false official statements. Damage Controlman 2nd Class Adam M. White, pleaded guilty to conspiracy and assault and was sentenced to 89 days confinement and reduction of two pay grades. Adams claims he and other sailors participated in the beating of two detainees at the direction of Chief Aviation Structural Mechanic Tracy Necaise because the prisoners spit and threw feces at guards. Necaise's attorney blamed upper-level Navy officers for the incident because they assigned the sailors to Camp Bucca without any prior experience working in law enforcement or detention facilities. Necaise and the remaining sailors pleaded not guilty and could face trial in 2009.

=== 2009 ===
On 17 September 2009 Camp Bucca closed down detainee operations.

== Prisoner abuse scandals ==
Camp Bucca was the scene of several notable incidents of abuse of prisoners by military personnel from its establishment in 2003 until its closure in 2009. It was the largest internment camp in American history.

In 2003, prisoners freed from Camp Bucca described "detainees punished by hours lying bound in the sun; being attacked by dogs; being deprived of sufficient water; spending days with hoods over their heads." After leaked pictures of abuse from another U.S. prison in Iraq, Abu Ghraib, stirred outrage and attention to that prison, one former Camp Bucca prisoner said, "I wish somebody could go take a picture of Camp Bucca."

A 2003 report by Amnesty International found that prisoners at Camp Bucca "were held in tents in the extreme heat and were not provided with sufficient drinking water or adequate washing facilities," and that "they were forced to use open trenches for toilets and were not given a change of clothes -- even after two months detention."

A 2004 report by United States Army investigators found "egregious acts and grave breaches of international law" at Camp Bucca.

A 2004 report by the International Committee of the Red Cross described Geneva Convention violations at Camp Bucca and stated that "inmates were routinely treated by their guards with general contempt, with petty violence such as having orders screamed at them and being cursed, kicked, struck with rifle butts, roughed up or pushed around. They were reportedly handcuffed in the back and hooded for the duration of the interrogation and were prohibited from talking to each other or to the guards." A Red Cross representative said that their report documented a "broad pattern" of abuse, as opposed to isolated incidents.

A 2006 report by Amnesty International contained alleged violations of the Fourth Geneva Convention by U.S. military personnel at Camp Bucca. These allegations include that "internees at Camp Bucca are alleged to have been exposed deliberately to extremes of both heat and cold, by being made to wait for hours in the heat of the sun while their accommodation was searched and forcibly showered with cold water and exposed to cold air conditioners."

In 2007, a Canadian citizen and U.S. resident who had been a prisoner at Camp Bucca described abuse by military personnel. The prisoner, Hossam Shaltout, called Camp Bucca a "torture camp" and said that prisoners were beaten and sexually humiliated. Shaltout said that his arms and legs had been hogtied by US soldiers who then placed scorpions on his body.

In 2008, six United States Navy personnel were charged and later convicted of abusing Camp Bucca prisoners after they beat the prisoners and locked several overnight in a room that had been filled with pepper spray.

== Role in the growth of ISIS ==
Camp Bucca has been described as playing an important role in shaping the Islamic State of Iraq and the Levant (ISIL). The detention of large numbers of Ba'athists and Islamists during the Iraqi insurgency provided them with the opportunity to forge alliances and learn from each other, combining the ideological fervour of the latter with the organizational skills of the former. Former Camp Bucca detainees who went on to become leaders in the Islamic State of Iraq and the Levant include Abu Bakr al-Baghdadi, the former leader of the ISIL before his death in October 2019; Abu Ibrahim al-Hashimi al-Qurashi who succeeded him; Abu Mohammed al-Adnani, spokesperson and senior ISIL leader; Abu Muslim al-Turkmani, al-Baghdadi's deputy; Haji Bakr, who spearheaded ISIL's expansion into Syria; Abu Abdulrahman al-Bilawi, the military leader responsible for planning the seizure of Mosul; and Abu Ayman al-Iraqi, another senior military leader. Ahmed al-Sharaa, who founded the Syrian Al Qaeda affiliate al-Nusra Front and would go on to become president of Syria, was also a Camp Bucca detainee.

== See also ==
- Abu Ghraib prison
- Lisa Girman
- List of United States Military installations in Iraq
- List of United Kingdom Military installations used during Operation Telic (2003)
