= 151st Theater Information Operations Group =

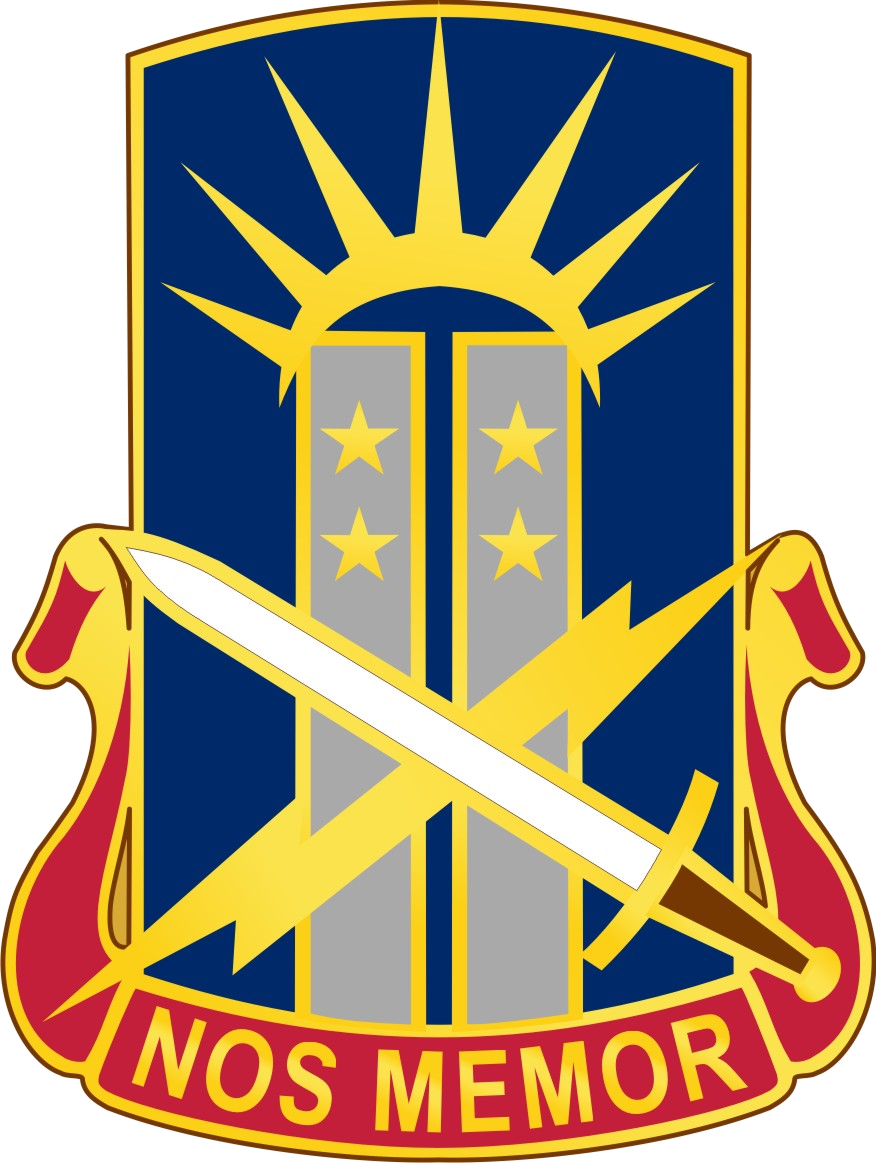
- The 151st TIOG's distinctive unit insignia displays the Twin Towers with a banner that reads in Latin "Nos Memor" (We Remember)
- Active: 2009–present
- Country: United States
- Branch: United States Army
- Type: U.S. Army Reserve
- Role: Information Operations Deploys modular and tailorable Information Operations forces worldwide in order to gain and maintain information dominance by conducting Information Warfare operations in the Information Environment." Information Operations (IO) are actions taken to affect adversary information and information systems while defending one's own information and information systems.
- Size: approximately 400
- Part of: U.S. Army Civil Affairs and Psychological Operations Command (USACAPOC)
- Garrison/HQ: Fort Totten, NY

Commanders
- Current commander: COL Jonathan Steinbach
- Notable commanders: Previous Commander: COL Frank Estes; COL (now BG) Marlene Markotan; COL (now BG) Jonathan Moyer; COL Curtis Carney; COL Molly McGlaughlin; COL (BG, Ret.) Leela Gray; COL Calvin DeWitt

Insignia
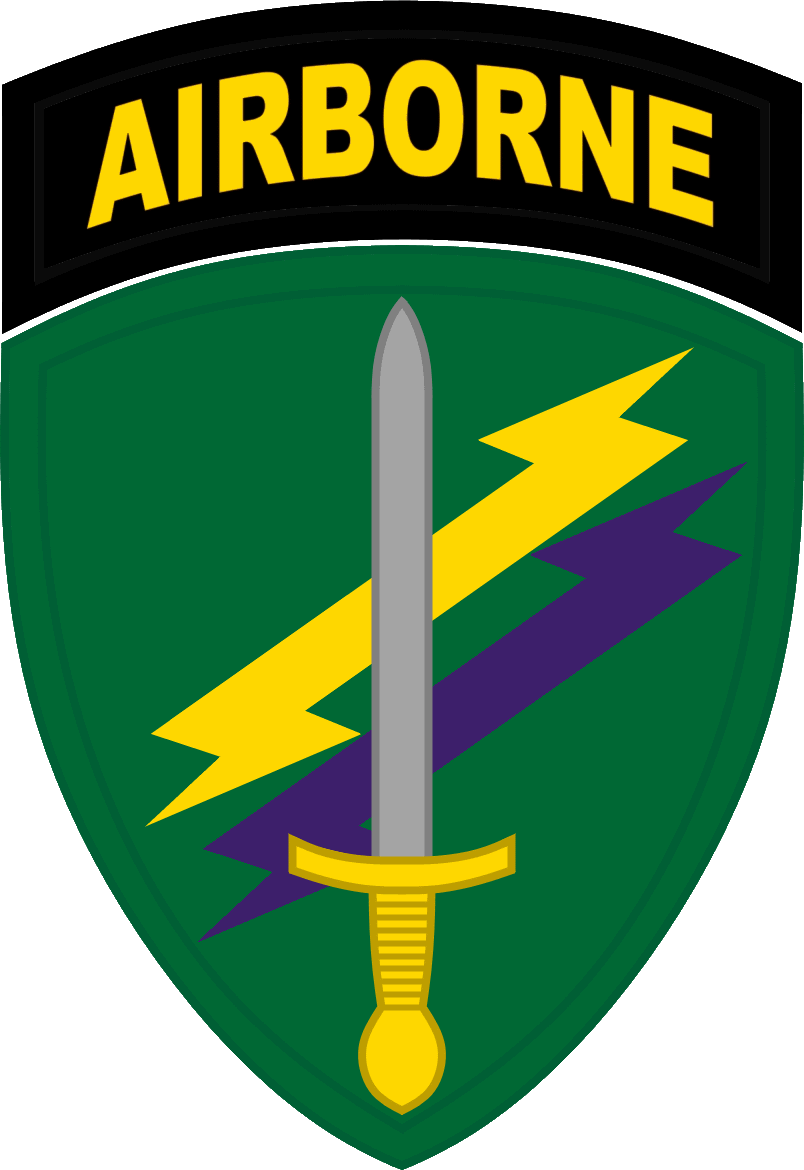
- USACAPOC Shoulder Sleeve Insignia worn by all subordinate units

The 151st Theater Information Operations Group, or 151st TIOG, is an Information Operations formation of the United States Army Reserve, headquartered at Fort Totten, New York. Founded in 2009, the 151st TIOG is the only Theater Information Operations Group in the U.S. Army Reserve. It is composed mostly of Army Reserve Soldiers in two battalions based out of Parks Reserve Forces Training Area (Camp Parks), Fort George G. Meade, and Fort Totten.

Historically, 151st TIOG was a major subordinate command under the 76th Operational Response Command (76th ORC). In October 2015, the 151st TIOG was realigned to the U.S. Army Civil Affairs and Psychological Operations Command (Airborne) (USACAPOC(A)). The 151st TIOG gained the 303rd Information Operations Battalion and deactivated the 302nd Information Operations Battalion after the 152nd TIOG was deactivated in late 2015.

Regionally aligned and globally engaged, the 151st TIOG is the U.S. Army Reserve Information Operations force provider to primarily USEUCOM, USAFRICOM, USCENTCOM, USSOUTHCOM, and United States Cyber Command. Since the establishment of the TIOGs in 2009, the demand signal for IO support to theater activities and operations has increased drastically. The command's soldiers bring civilian expertise, education, and qualifications not found among Regular Army soldiers. The projects the unit coordinates are the subject of many of the "Good News" stories run in the media each day across Africa, Europe, Middle East, and various other locations worldwide.

== Information Operations ==
Information Operations (United States) is a category of direct and indirect support operations for the United States Military. By definition in Joint Publication 3-13, "IO are described as the integrated employment of electronic warfare (EW), computer network operations (CNO), psychological operations (PSYOP), military deception (MILDEC), and operations security (OPSEC), in concert with specified supporting and related capabilities, to influence, disrupt, corrupt or usurp adversarial human and automated decision making while protecting our own." Information Operations (IO) are actions taken to affect adversary information and information systems while defending one's own information and information systems.

== Mission ==
The 151st TIOG primary mission is on order, to deploy modular and tailorable Information Operations forces worldwide in order to gain and maintain information dominance by conducting Information Warfare operations in the Information Environment." Information Operations (IO) are actions taken to affect adversary information and information systems while defending one's own information and information systems.

Information Operations units are the field commander's capability to synchronize and de-conflict information related capabilities (IRC) in the commander's information environment. The soldiers make up teams which interface and provide Information Operations expertise to the staff. 151st TIOG Information Operations soldiers are particularly suited for this mission since they are Army Reserve soldiers with civilian occupations such as law enforcement, engineering, medicine, law, banking, public administration, etc; and, civilian education and qualifications such as Project Management Professional (PMP), Doctor of Philosophy (PhD), Juris Doctor (J.D), Master of Business Administration (MBA), Master of Public Administration (MPA), etc.

Information Operations soldiers have been integral to U.S. missions across North West Africa, East Africa, Europe, Middle East, and various other locations.

== Organization ==
The group is a subordinate unit of the 350th Civil Affairs Command. As of January 2026 the group consists of the following battalions, each of which consists of a headquarters and headquarters company, and two information operations companies.

- 151st Theater Information Operations Group, at Fort Totten (NY)
  - Headquarters and Headquarters Company, 151st Theater Information Operations Group, at Fort Totten (NY)
  - 301st Information Operations Battalion, at Fort Totten (NY)
    - Headquarters and Headquarters Company, 301st Information Operations Battalion, at Fort Totten (NY)
    - Alpha Company, 301st Information Operations Battalion, at Fort Totten (NY)
    - Bravo Company, 301st Information Operations Battalion, at Fort Totten (NY)
  - 303rd Information Operations Battalion, at Camp Parks (CA)
    - Headquarters and Headquarters Company, 303rd Information Operations Battalion, at Camp Parks (CA)
    - Alpha Company, 303rd Information Operations Battalion, at Camp Parks (CA)
    - Bravo Company, 303rd Information Operations Battalion, at Camp Parks (CA)

== See also ==
- 56th Theater Information Operations Group
- Information Operations (United States)
- U.S. Army Civil Affairs and Psychological Operations Command (Airborne)
- United States Army Reserve
- Electronic Warfare
- Computer network operations
- Psychological Operations
- Civil Affairs
- Civil-military operations
- Military Deception
- Disinformation
- Misinformation
- Operations security
- Cyberwarfare
- Network-centric warfare
- Communications Security
- Command and control warfare
- Political Warfare
- Psychological Warfare
- Public affairs (military)
- Irregular Warfare
- iWar
- Information Operations Roadmap
