= 1st Information Operations Command (Land) =

US Army Cyber Command unit

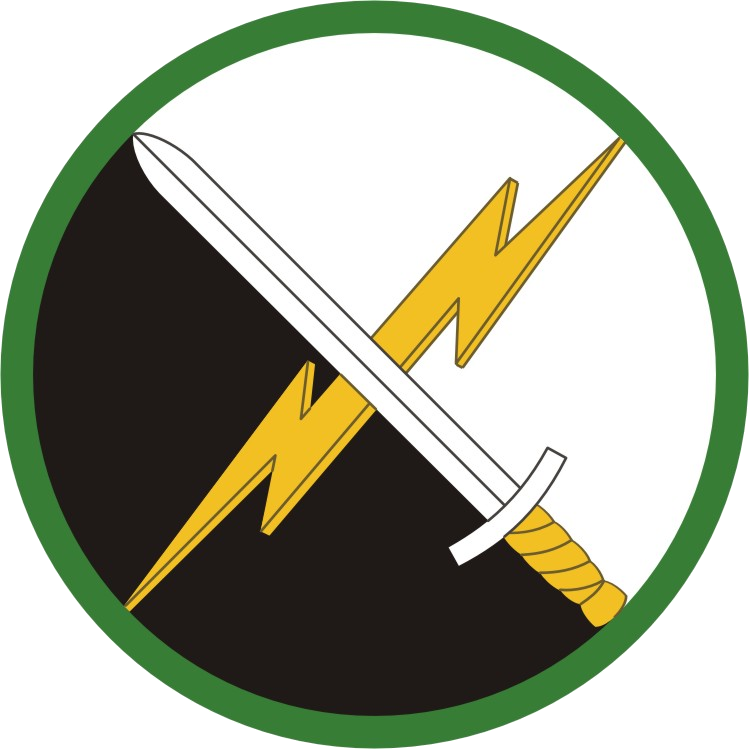
- 1st IOC shoulder sleeve insignia (color version)
- Active: 2002 - May 8, 2025
- Country: United States
- Branch: (United States Army) U.S. Army
- Type: Command
- Role: Military information operations
- Part of: U.S. Army Intelligence and Security Command (INSCOM); U.S. Army Cyber Command (ARCYBER)
- Garrison/HQ: Fort Belvoir, Virginia
- Nickname: 1st IOC
- Website: Official website

Commanders
- Current commander: COL Willie Rodney

Insignia
- Distinctive unit insignia

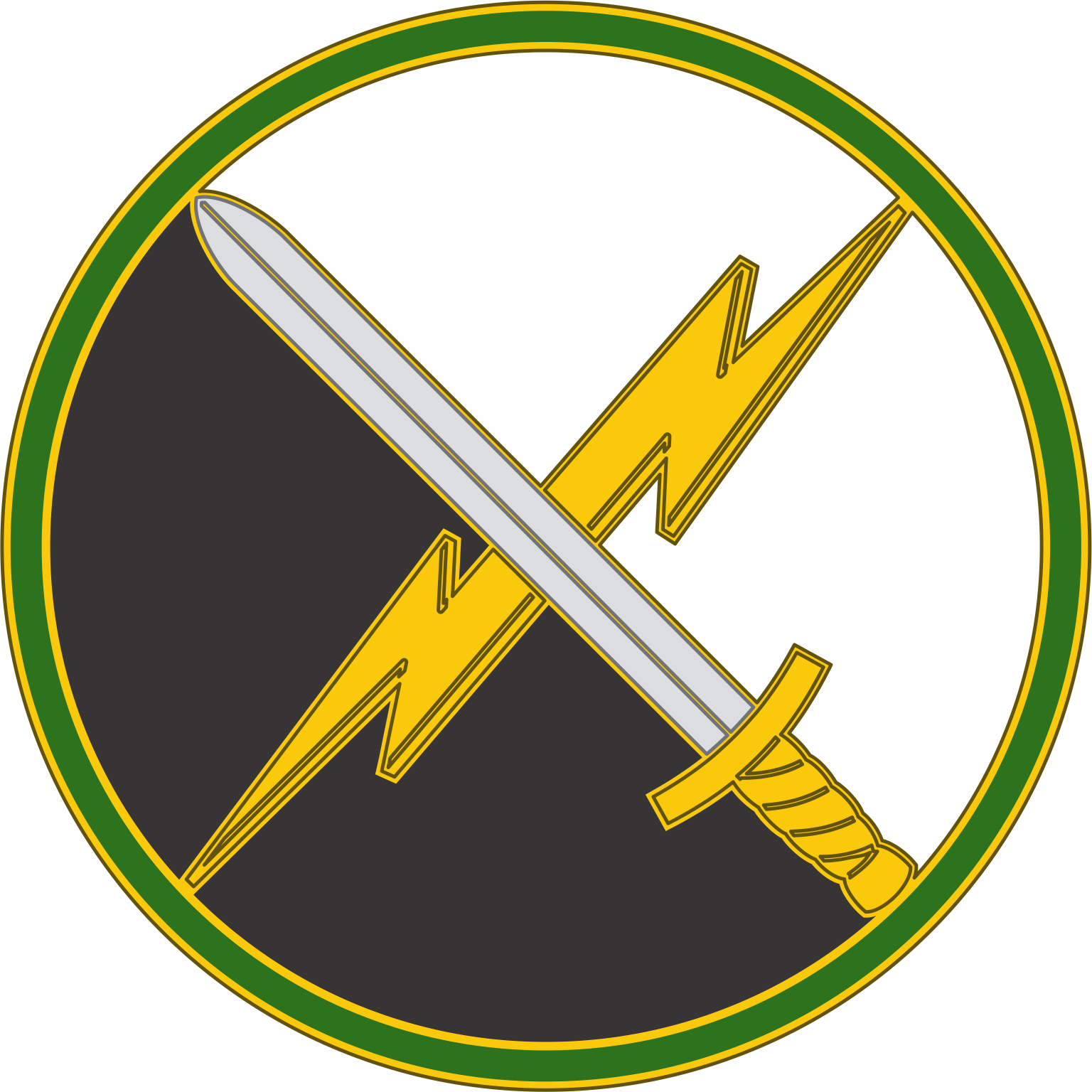
- Combat Service Identification Badge

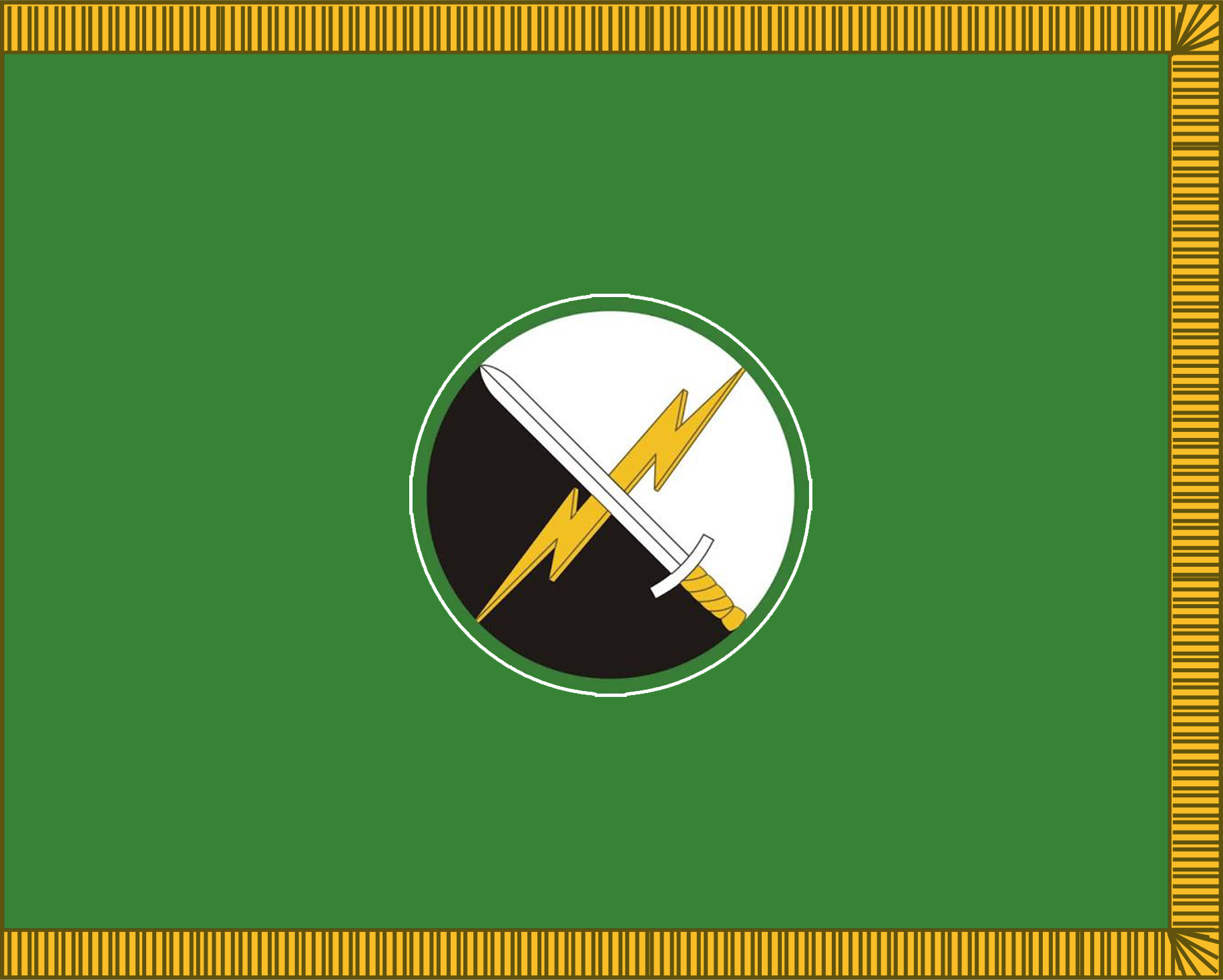
- 1st Information Operations Command Flag

The 1st Information Operations Command (Land), formerly the Land Information Warfare Activity Information Dominance Center (LIWA/IDC), was an information operations unit under the operational control of U.S. Army Cyber Command (ARCYBER) and headquartered at Fort Belvoir, Virginia.

It provided multi-disciplinary Information Operations (IO) support to the component and major commands of the United States Army. 1st IO CMD had broad authority to coordinate IO topics and establish contact with Army organizations, the United States Navy (USN) and United States Air Force (USAF), and JCS IO Centers, and with United States Department of Defense (DoD) and National Agency IO elements.

== Mission ==
1st Information Operations Command provided IO support to the U.S. Army and other military forces through deployable IO support teams, IO Reach-back planning and analysis and the synchronization and conduct of Army Computer Network Operations (CNO), in coordination with other CNO and network operations stakeholders, to operationally integrate IO, reinforce forward IO capabilities, and to defend cyberspace in order to enable IO throughout the information environment.

== Organization ==
1st Information Operations Command comprised two battalions. They conducted the command's Information Operations, Vulnerability Assessment, and Computer Network Operations mission. The Army Reserve Integration Element augmented and supported the battalions. The Headquarters and Headquarters Company provided Command and Control, military justice, administration, training, and logistical support.

=== Staff ===
The 1st Information Operations Command's primary staff sections supported Soldiers and staff to carry out the 1st Information Operations Command's Mission. The Command Judge Advocate was the primary legal advisor to the commander's legal matters in the command. Resource Management provided budgetary support and oversight. Contracting staff was directly responsible for the command's services contract administration. The S1 through S6 provided support in the areas of personnel, intelligence, operations, logistical, and automation or information technology.

- S-1 – Personnel
- S-2 – Intelligence
- S-3 – Operations
- S-4 – Logistics
- S-6 – Automation
- CJA – Command Judge Advocate
- Resource Management
- Contract Management

=== Headquarters and Headquarters Company ===
==== Mission ====
The Headquarters and Headquarters Company (HHC) provide Command and Control (C2), military justice, administration, training, and command logistics in support of 1st Information Operations Command's Brigade and Battalions, Active Component (AC), Active Guard Reserve (AGR), Army Reserve (USAR), Army National Guard (ARNG), Department of the Army (DA) Civilians, contractors, and Families.

==== Functions ====
- Support the commander's leadership responsibilities for moral, welfare, and discipline
- Manage unit-level supply and maintenance
- Facilitate various Army training courses
- Provide human resources support
- Facilitate family readiness group

=== 1st Battalion ===
==== Mission ====
Organize, train, and deploy multi-skilled IO teams worldwide in support of Army, Joint, and Interagency information operations and vulnerability assessment to provide supported commanders a unique advantage in the information environment.

==== Functions ====
- Deploy in support of unit operations
- Analyze, assist, and challenge a unit's posture in the information environment
- Participate in unit training and exercises
- Assist with IO planning from strategic to tactical levels
- Conduct IO policies, procedures, and accreditation review
- Train and certify OPSEC officers

=== 2nd Battalion ===
==== Mission ====
2nd Information Operations Battalion conducts multi-functional assessments and security training to continuously improve the readiness and resilience of friendly forces against sophisticated adversary attacks.

==== Functions ====
- Executes effects based Cyberspace Operations ISO Army and Joint Exercises
- Conducts Operational Vulnerability Assessments
- Establishes and maintains PRT ISO Persistent Penetration Testing (PPT) cyber campaigns
- Mission Assurance Detachments Functions
- Integrates MA capabilities ISO Operational Technologies and Infrastructure assessments
- Conducts Cyber-to-Physical (Control Systems) Assessments ISO NDAA 1650
- Certifies Army PENTESTING programs
- Provides OPSEC Doctrine and Policy review
- Supports DA G34 Protection Assessments
- Cyber Support Detachment Functions
- Executes equipment procurement and lifecycle management
- Maintains remote operation capabilities
- Builds and Maintains attack Platforms
- Tool/exploit development

=== Army Reserve Element (ARE) ===
The Army Reserve Element (ARE) has administrative control of U.S. Army Reserve personnel assigned to 1st Information Operations Command. It provides trained and ready soldiers in support of 1st Information Operations Command's global mission to operationally integrate information operations, defend cyberspace, and provide reach-back planning and analysis for military stakeholders. On 3 December 2013, the ARE won 1st and 3rd places in the annual DC3 Digital Forensic Challenge. The Defense Cyber Crime Center Digital Forensic Challenge, provides digital artifacts comparable to what Soldiers might examine in a real-world cybersecurity situation. DC3 asked players to identify hidden files, perform analysis of suspicious network traffic, analyze registry entries and recover user passwords.

== Command responsibilities ==
=== Operations ===
Acting as an operations center, an intelligence analysis center, and a communications hub, the 1st IO CMD Information Dominance Center (IDC) is the focal point of all 1st IO CMD activities in support of the Army and of Joint Task Force-Global Network Operations. 1st IO CMD teams deployed worldwide are continuously linked to the IDC via a number of communications means. Some examples of these communication means are common user circuits, strategic communications links, and dedicated satellite terminals. The IOC performs as a typical command operations center, maintaining the status of IO events worldwide, and orchestrating the activities of 1st IO's deployed teams and internal supporting activities.

=== Analysis ===
As an analysis center, the IDC provides dedicated support to 1st IO CMD's deployed teams and the commands they serve. Tailored analytical products are generated, frequently on a quick-response basis, to meet a deployed team's immediate needs. The IDC also monitors potential trouble spots worldwide, preparing to support contingency operations with IO-related products should the need arise. The IDC uses high-capacity communications links to access selected information from a number of databases maintained by a number of other commands, agencies, and organizations. In addition to providing IO support to the operations process, the IDC provides an advanced environment to leverage new technologies and explore emerging concepts. The IDC also provides support to exercises.

=== Communications ===
The IDC's communications capability serves both operational and analytical functions by using a variety of links to supported commands and deployed 1st IO CMD teams. The IDC also has access to DoD and non-DoD government organizations participating in IO at the National level, and exchanges information with intelligence organizations possessing IO information and subject matter expertise. Collectively, the ability to communicate worldwide permits the small number of analysts resident in the IDC to provide tailored assessments rapidly and efficiently. Finally, in support of the Army Computer Emergency Response Team (ACERT), the IDC uses communications to flash computer intrusion alerts and countermeasures across the Army.

== Deactivation ==
The 1st Information Operations Command was deactivated on May 8, 2025, in a ceremony in the Thurman Auditorium at Fort Belvoir. The Army will be creating new Theater Information Advantage Detachments as a result of the unit's mission in the past.

== See also ==
- List of cyber warfare forces
- 56th Theater Information Operations Group
- 151st Theater Information Operations Group
