= 110th Information Operations Battalion =

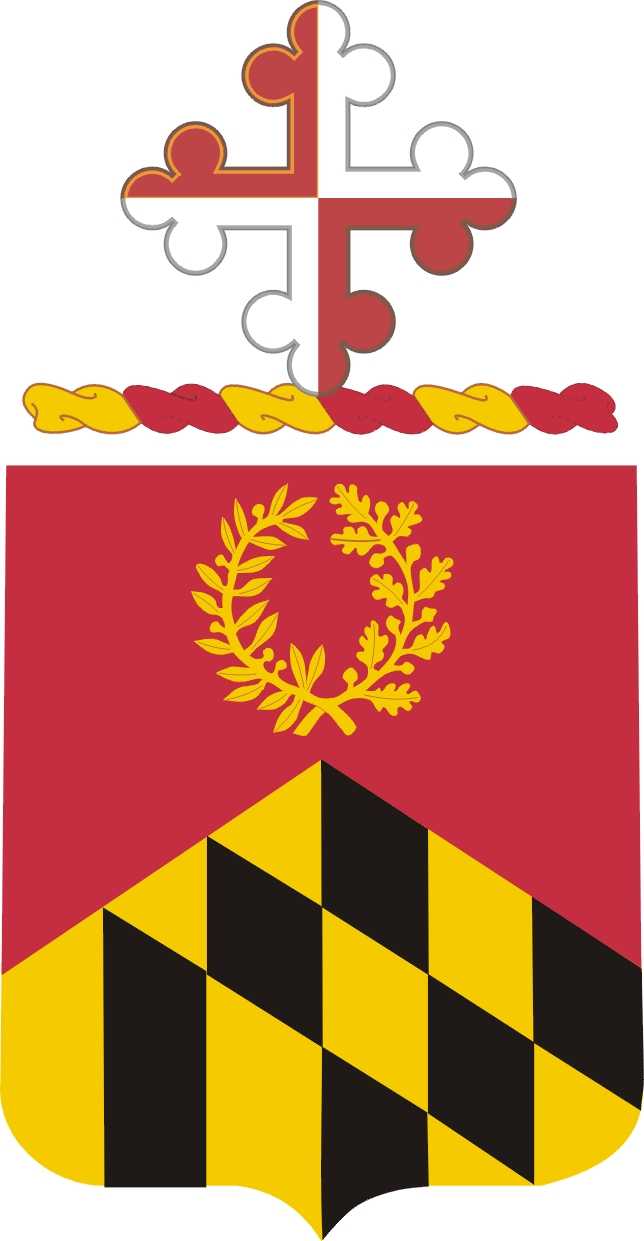
- Coat of arms
- Active: 2008–present
- Country: United States
- Allegiance: Maryland
- Branch: Maryland Army National Guard
- Type: Information Operations
- Size: Battalion
- Part of: 56th Theater Information Operations Group
- Garrison: Annapolis, Maryland
- Motto(s): Informatio Dominatus Orbis Terrarum

Commanders
- Current commander: Lt. Col. Adam C. Kavalsky

Insignia
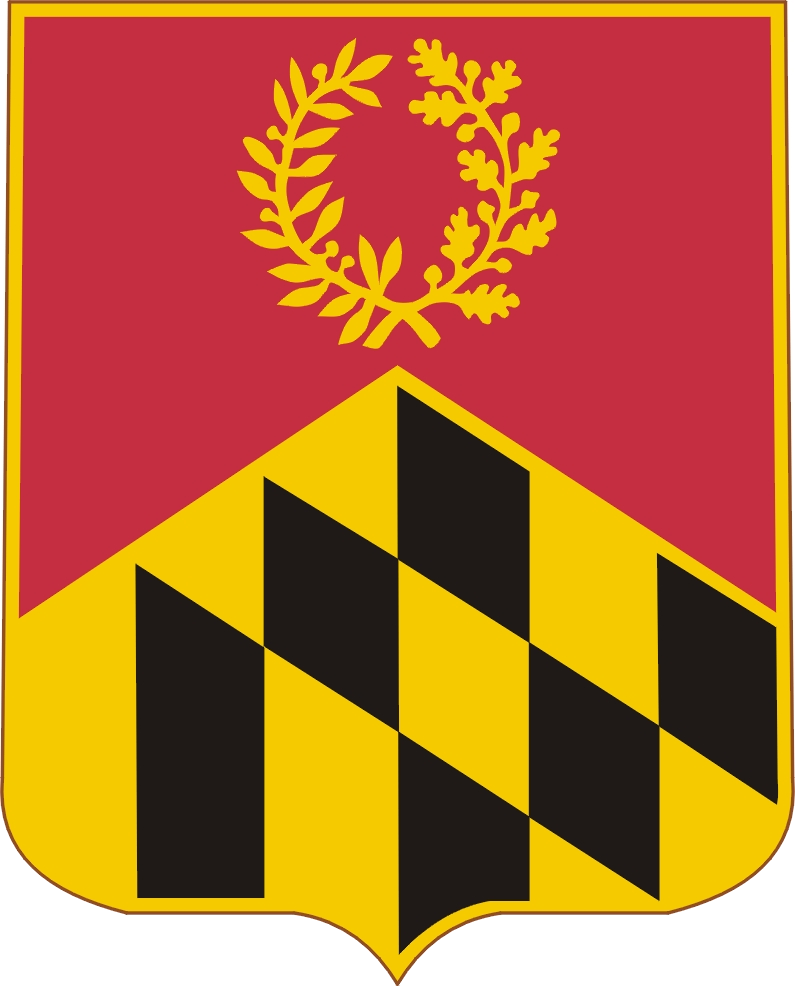
- Distinctive unit insignia

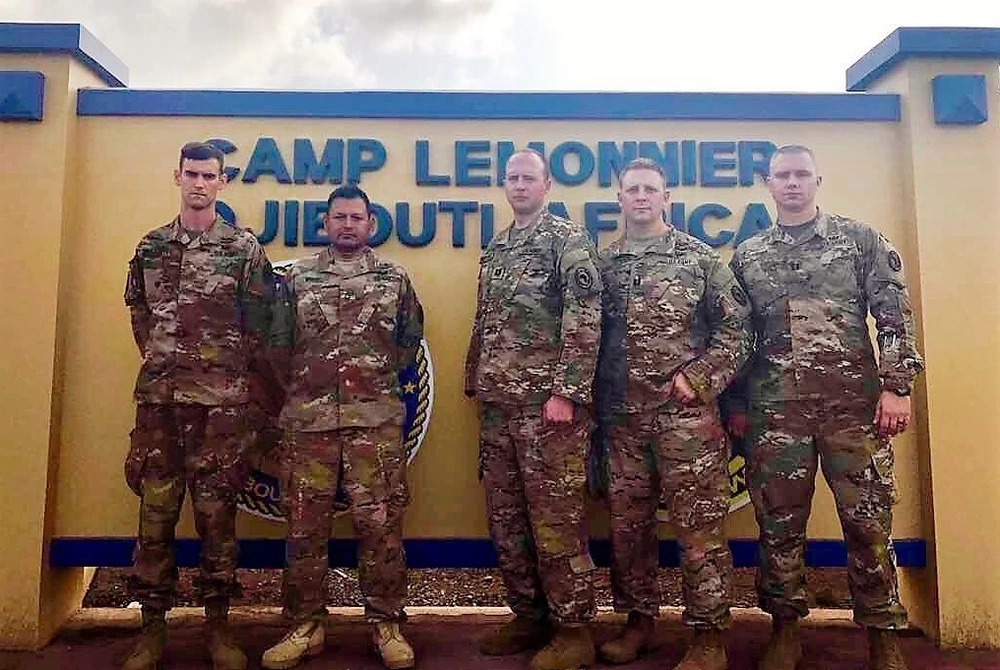
FST from the 110th posing at Camp Lemonnier, Djibouti in 2017

The 110th Information Operations (IO) Battalion was federally recognized as an organization on April 1, 2008. Following the inactivation of the 2d Battalion, 110th Field Artillery Regiment, the 110th IO battalion was given the honor to carry the 2d Battalion 110th Field Artillery lineage which dates back to World War I. The 110th IO FSB was designed to provide trained, deployable, culturally aware, and regionally focused information operations teams to perform tactical strategic-theater IO tasks.

The unit's higher operational headquarters is the 56th Theater Information Operations Group, Washington Army National Guard. Maryland National Guard administrative and operational control (Title 32 and State Active Duty operations) of the battalion has been reorganized from under the 29th Combat Aviation Brigade in Edgewood, Maryland to the 58th Expeditionary Military Intelligence Brigade in Towson, Maryland

== Mission ==
The mission of the 110th IO is to conduct tactical through strategic level Information Operations in support of global military operations by training and deploying culturally aware and regionally focused IO teams IOT defeat adversary information operations and gain information superiority in the information environment; or, be prepared to conduct limited, approved IO tasks in support of state and local authorities during governor-declared state emergencies and provide support to restore civil order, as directed by the governor and the adjutant general.

In support of its federal mission, the 110th IO Battalion has deployed many field support team (FST) since its activation, to multiple areas, providing IO operations to the active duty force. The battalion's motto, “Informatio Dominatus Orbis Terrarum” meaning “Information Dominates the World” reaffirms the full spectrum of strategic planning across a range of military operations.

== Deployments & Activations ==
The 110th IO FSB deployed its first four-man FST on December 10, 2010, in support of a Special Operation Command - Joint Task Force in Afghanistan. On October 6, 2011, the 110th IO FSB deployed its first five-man IO FST to the Horn of Africa (HOA). The mission is an enduring mission.

In support of their domestic mission, the 110th IO FSB was awarded the Maryland Outstanding Unit Ribbon for their outstanding support from April 30, 2015, to May 4, 2015, to the Maryland State and Baltimore law enforcement during the 2015 Baltimore protests.

The 110th IO FSB activated 59 Soldiers in support of “Operation Baltimore Rally” to assist local law enforcement with peacekeeping operations to restore and sustain good order. This was the second activation of the Maryland National Guard on this large of a scale since the Baltimore riot of 1968.

The 110th IO FSB was deployed to various locations throughout the city of Baltimore. The soldiers performed various missions from complex staff functions to guarding Baltimore City Hall, Mondawmin Mall, and the Baltimore Police Station in District 12. Soldiers were tasked as Task Force Chesapeake staff operating out of the Fifth Regiment Armory in Baltimore Maryland and the remaining soldiers were assigned to protect and defend Baltimore City Hall.

== Lineage ==
The 110th inherits its lineage from the 110th Field Artillery Regiment which was constituted December 28, 1915, in the Maryland National Guard as a Light Artillery Battery. Organized from Plattsburgh graduates and mustered into state service December 29, 1915, at Baltimore. Mustered into Federal service July 5, 1916; mustered out of Federal service October 6, 1916. Expanded April–July 1917 to form Batteries A, B, and C, Maryland Field Artillery. Drafted into Federal service 5 August 1917.

The regiment was consolidated September 18, 1917, with National Guard units from Maryland and the District of Columbia to form the 112th Field Artillery and assigned to the 29th Division. Redesignated November 27, 1917, as the 110th Field Artillery and remained assigned to the 29th Division. Demobilized June 4, 1919, at Camp Lee, Virginia. Reorganized and Federally recognized March 31, 1925, in the Maryland National Guard as the 110th Field Artillery, with headquarters at Pikesville Maryland, and assigned to the 29th Division.

The regiment was inducted into Federal service February 3, 1941, at home stations. Regiment broken up February 28, 1942, and its elements reorganized and redesignated as follows: 1st and 2d Battalions as the 110th and 224th Field Artillery Battalions, respectively, elements of the 29th Infantry Division (remainder of regiment disbanded). 110th Field Artillery Battalion inactivated January 6, 1946, at Camp Kilmer, New Jersey. Reorganized and Federally recognized November 25, 1946, with headquarters at Pikesville.

224th Field Artillery Battalion inactivated January 16, 1946, at Camp Kilmer. Reorganized and Federally recognized November 25, 1946, with headquarters at Pikesville. Headquarters, 110th Field Artillery (reconstituted August 25, 1945, in the Maryland National Guard) and the 110th and 224th Field Artillery Battalions consolidated March 1, 1959, to form the 110th Artillery, a parent regiment under the Combat Arms Regimental System, to consist of the 1st, 2d, and 3d Howitzer Battalions, elements of the 29th Infantry Division.

Reorganized March 1, 1963, to consist of the 1st and 2d Battalions, elements of the 29th Infantry Division. Reorganized January 21, 1968, to consist of the 2d Battalion, an element of the 28th Infantry Division. Redesignated May 1, 1972, as the 110th Field Artillery. Reorganized April 1, 1975, to consist of the 2d Battalion, an element of the 58th Infantry Brigade. Reorganized July 1, 1986, to consist of the 2d Battalion, an element of the 29th Infantry Division. Withdrawn June 1, 1989, from the Combat Arms Regimental System and reorganized under the U.S. Army Regimental System.

The 2nd Battalion, 110th Field Artillery was disbanded on August 8, 2009. The heritage of the 2nd Battalion and the regiment as a whole was carried on by the 110th Information Operations Battalion.

== Campaign participation credit ==
World War I (Streamer without inscription)
World War II

1. Normandy (with arrowhead)
2. Northern France
3. Rhineland
4. Ardennes-Alsace
5. Central Europe

Battery A (Westminster), 2d Battalion, additionally entitled to: World War I

1. Meuse-Argonne
2. Alsace 1918

Decorations: French Croix de Guerre with Palm, World War II, Streamer embroidered BEACHES OF NORMANDY (110th and 224th Field Artillery Battalions cited; DA GO 43, 1950)
Headquarters Battery (Pikesville) and Battery C (Pikesville), 2d Battalion, each additionally entitled to: Meritorious Unit Commendation (Army); Streamer embroidered EUROPEAN THEATER (Service Battery, 110th Field Artillery Battalion, cited; GO 66, 29th Infantry Division, 26 February 1945; Service Battery, 224th Field Artillery Battalion, cited; GO 97, 29th Infantry Division, 16 March 1945)

== Coat of arms ==
Shield: Parti per chevron gules and paly of six pieces, or and sable, a bend counter-changed, in chief a garland of the second, the dexter half laurel the sinister oak.
Crest: That for the regiments and separate battalions of the Maryland Army National Guard: On a wreath of the colors, or and gules, a cross bottony per cross quarterly gules and argent.
Motto: Sicut Quercus (As the Oak).
Symbolism: The red color on the shield indicates the arm of service, the wreath symbolizes participation in World War I and is divided per pale, the dexter half showing laurel leaves symbolizing achievement, and the sinister half, oak leaves in allusion to the beautiful grove of oak leaves in which an armory of the regiment was located. The Calvert arms in the base are from the shield of the state of Maryland.
