= Biologically Inspired Tactical Security Infrastructure =

System to detect computer damage in battle

Biologically Inspired Tactical Security Infrastructure (BITSI) is a system to detect and repair computer damage in the battlespace.

== See also ==
- Information warfare
