= Joint Information Operations Warfare Center =

Joint Information Operations Warfare Center (JIOWC)
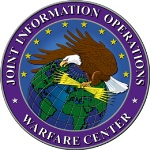
- Official Emblem
- Active: 2005 (approx.)-present
- Country: United States
- Branch: Joint Chiefs of Staff
- Type: Information Operations
- Location: Washington, D.C.
- Decorations: Joint Meritorious Unit Award

Commanders
- Director: Unknown

The Joint Information Operations Warfare Center (JIOWC) was created by the U.S. Strategic Command (USSTRATCOM) sometime around 2004 or 2005 at Lackland Air Force Base, Texas, with the intent of coordinating and executing U.S. information operations at the strategic level. On September 12, 2011, by executive order, the JIOWC was chartered as a Chairman's Controlled Activity aligned under the Joint Staff. The JIOWC falls directly under the Joint Staff Operations Directorate (J3), but works closely with personnel under the Deputy Director Global Operations, J39 (DDGO).

== History ==
The Joint Electronic Warfare Center (JEWC) was established by the Secretary of Defense in October 1980 and reported to the Joint Staff. In September 1994, the JEWC's mission was expanded and the organization was renamed the Joint Command and Control Warfare Center (JC2WC). At this time the JC2WC was staffed with 166 personnel and provided operational support to missions including: Operation Vigilant Warrior and Operation Deny Flight. In 1998, as a result of the Defense Reform Initiative (DRI), the JC2WC was realigned from the Joint Staff to US Atlantic Command. Further expansion of the JC2WC mission resulted in redesignation as the Joint Information Operations Center (JIOC). In October 1999, the JIOC was realigned as a subordinate command of USSPACECOM. In conjunction with the October 1, 2002 transition of USSPACECOM to USSTRATCOM, the JIOC was realigned as a subordinate command to USSTRATCOM. In 2006 the JIOC was redesignated the Joint Information Operations Warfare Center (JIOWC) and at the time it was located at Lackland Air Force Base, near San Antonio, Texas with the intent of coordinating and executing U.S. information operations at the strategic level. Potentially due to concerns from then Secretary of Defense, Robert Gates, the Central Intelligence Agency, Department of State, and the National Security Staff, President Obama signed Change One to the 2011 Unified Command Plan, on September 12, 2011. This plan transferred the JIOWC's Information Operations, Military Deception, and Operations Security missions from USSTRATCOM to the Joint Staff as a Chairman-controlled activity (CCA).

On January 30, 2018, the JIOWC was awarded the Joint Meritorious Unit Award for meritorious service or achievement during the period of service from January 1, 2012, to September 15, 2015.

== Mission ==
Currently, the JIOWC is tasked with supporting the Joint Chiefs of Staff in improving the ability of the United States Department of Defense (USDOD) to "meet combatant command information-related requirements, improve development of information-related capabilities, and ensure operational integration and coherence across combatant commands and other DOD activities." The JIOWC director is a member of the Senior Executive Service and the deputy director will serve on a 3-year rotational basis among the military services.

A sub organization of the JIOWC is the Joint OPSEC Support Element (JOSE). The JOSE is designed to provide OPSEC training, program review, surveys, and plans and exercise support to the combatant commands.

== See also ==
- Information Operations
- Psychological Operations
- Military Deception
- Operations Security
- Electronic Warfare
- Military Public Affairs
- Cyberwarfare
