= 56th Theater Information Operations Group =

56th Theater Information Operations Group (TIOG)
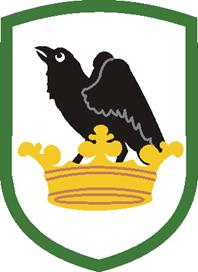
- Shoulder Sleeve Insignia
- Active: 2006-present
- Country: United States
- Allegiance: Washington
- Branch: United States Army
- Type: Information Operations
- Size: Brigade (equivalent)
- Part of: Washington Army National Guard
- Garrison/HQ: Joint Base Lewis-McChord, Washington
- Motto: Defending Mercury
- Colors: Teal Blue & Gold
- Engagements: Operation Inherent Resolve

Commanders
- Current commander: Col. Casey De Groof

Insignia
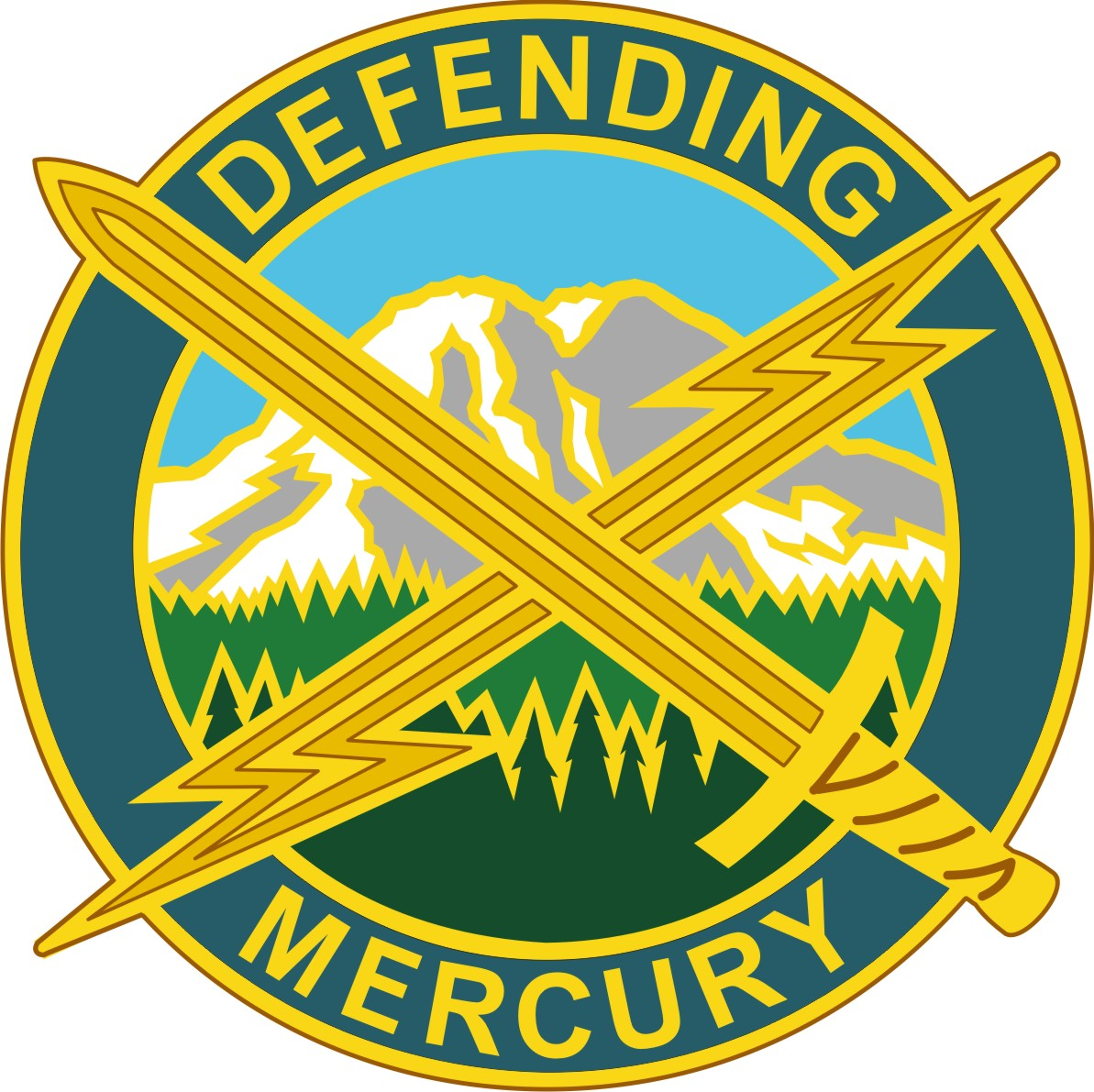
- Distinctive Unit Insignia

The 56th Theater Information Operations Group is a brigade-sized command of the United States Army National Guard based in Washington, and Maryland. In 2015 it took on the additional role as a major subordinate command in the Washington Army National Guard, aligning military intelligence and special operations forces under its command for administrative control.

As one of three TIOGs in the United States Army, the 56th provides information operations planning, synchronization, and assessment support to Army echelons at theater and Army Service Component Command down to brigade level. The 56th and its battalion elements have never deployed as commands but instead form and deploy purpose-built information operations teams designed to provide the support required by requesting commands. TIOGs maintain regional focuses to provide supported commands additional regional expertise and capability to plan, synchronize, and assess information operations, activities, and investments within the area of operations. The 56th is identified by the U.S. Army Cyber Command (ARCYBER) as one of its units supporting its Influence core capability. The command relationship with ARCYBER is unclear.

The 56th TIOG is regionally focused as the primary provider of information operations forces for USINDOPACOM, under USARPAC, but has also supported operations in USCENTCOM USAFRICOM and USSOUTHCOM.

== Composition ==
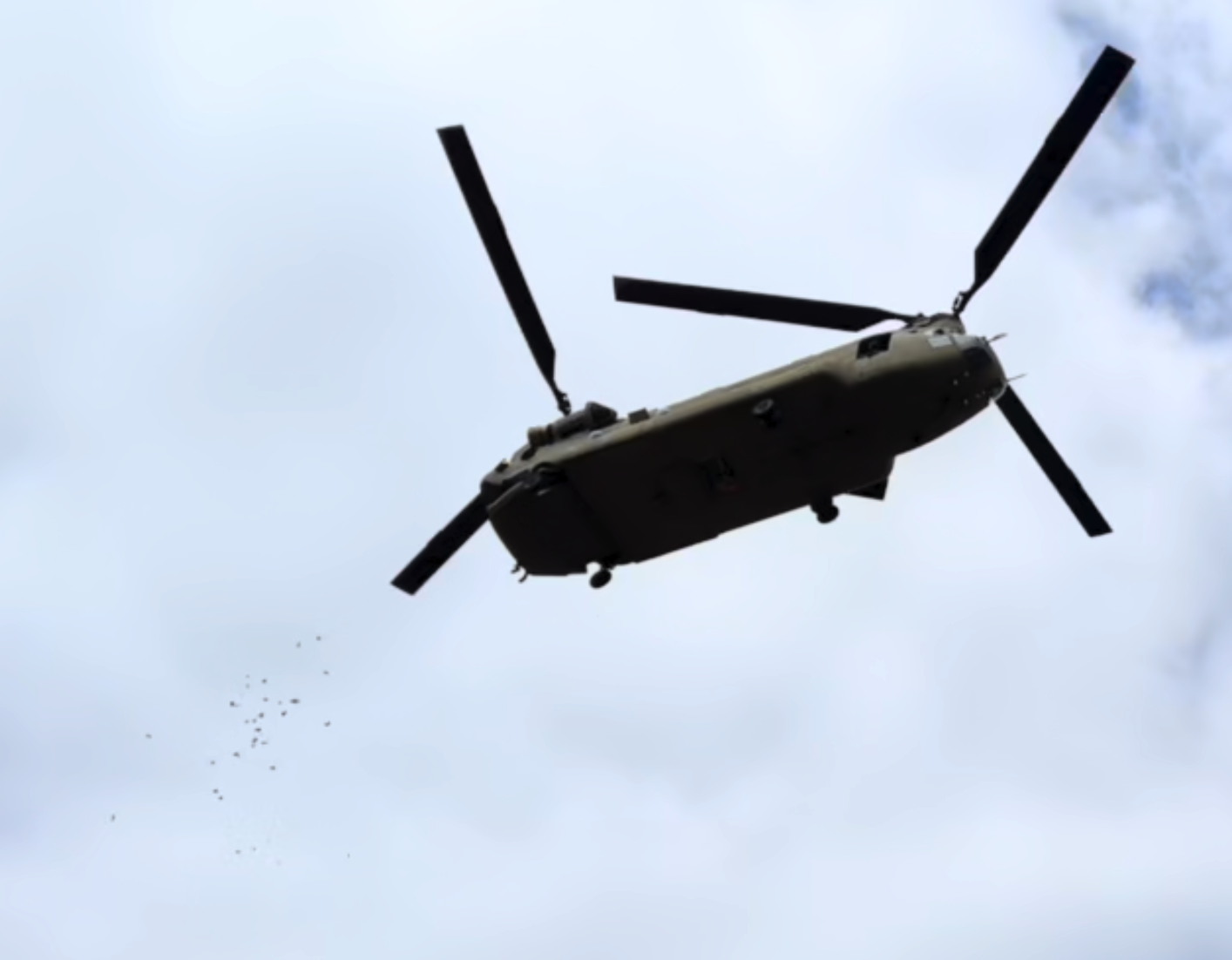
156th IO Battalion trains with airborne leaflet drops, with support from the 12th Psychological Operations Battalion and 1-168th GSAB at Joint Base Lewis-McChord July 2023.

Two battalions and a headquarters company are assigned to the 56th as a Theater Information Operations Group. It assumed its current organizational structure as of September 1, 2009, when the Maryland Army National Guard activated the 110th Information Operations Battalion.

- Headquarters & Headquarters Company (HHC), 56th TIOG – JBLM, Washington
- 110th Information Operations Battalion – Annapolis, Maryland
- 156th Information Operations Battalion – JBLM, Washington

In 2015, the Washington Army National Guard reorganized, designating the 56th TIOG as a major subordinate command within the state. Under this designation, the 56th assumed administrative control, and operational control (Title 32 and State Active Duty operations) of additional Washington National Guard units. As a major subordinate command, it has the following organizational structure.

- Headquarters & Headquarters Company (HHC), 56th TIOG – JBLM, Washington
- Special Operations Detachment - Pacific
  - 1161st Rigger Detachment
- 122nd Theater Public Affairs Support Element
  - 141st Military History Detachment
- 156th Information Operations Battalion
  - Headquarters & Headquarters Detachment (HHD)
  - Company A
  - Company B
- 341st Military Intelligence Battalion (Linguist)
  - Company A – Fairchild Air Force Base, Washington
  - Company B
  - Company D
- Company A, 1st Battalion, 19th Special Forces Group (Airborne) – Buckley, Washington.

== History ==
In September 2006, the Washington Army National Guard organized Headquarters and Headquarters Company, 56th Theater Information Operations Group to stand up the first of two TIOGs in the U.S. Army. Three years later, the 56th was federally recognized on January 28, 2009, as a subordinate unit under the 96th Troop Command.

In July 2015, the Washington Army National Guard reorganized the 96th Troop Command, separating the 56th and elevating them to a major subordinate command. Later that year, on September 29, 2015, the 56th moved into the Information Operations Readiness Center (IORC), Joint Base Lewis-McChord, after commemorating its opening with a ribbon-cutting ceremony. This 127,100-square-foot facility came at a cost of $27 million and serves as the headquarters for the 56th and the majority of its subordinate units.

=== Operation Inherent Resolve ===
Since 2014, the 56th TIOG's 156th Information Operations Battalion has been supporting rotational forces into the USCENTCOM region in support of Operation Inherent Resolve. In 2019, they were joined by another 56th unit, the 122nd TPASE, which divided its mobilized forces between Operation Inherent Resolve and Operation Resolute Support, in Afghanistan.

=== Horn of Africa ===
For more than 13 rotations, the 110th Information Operations Battalion has deployed specialty teams in support of CJTF-HOA.

=== Domestic operations ===
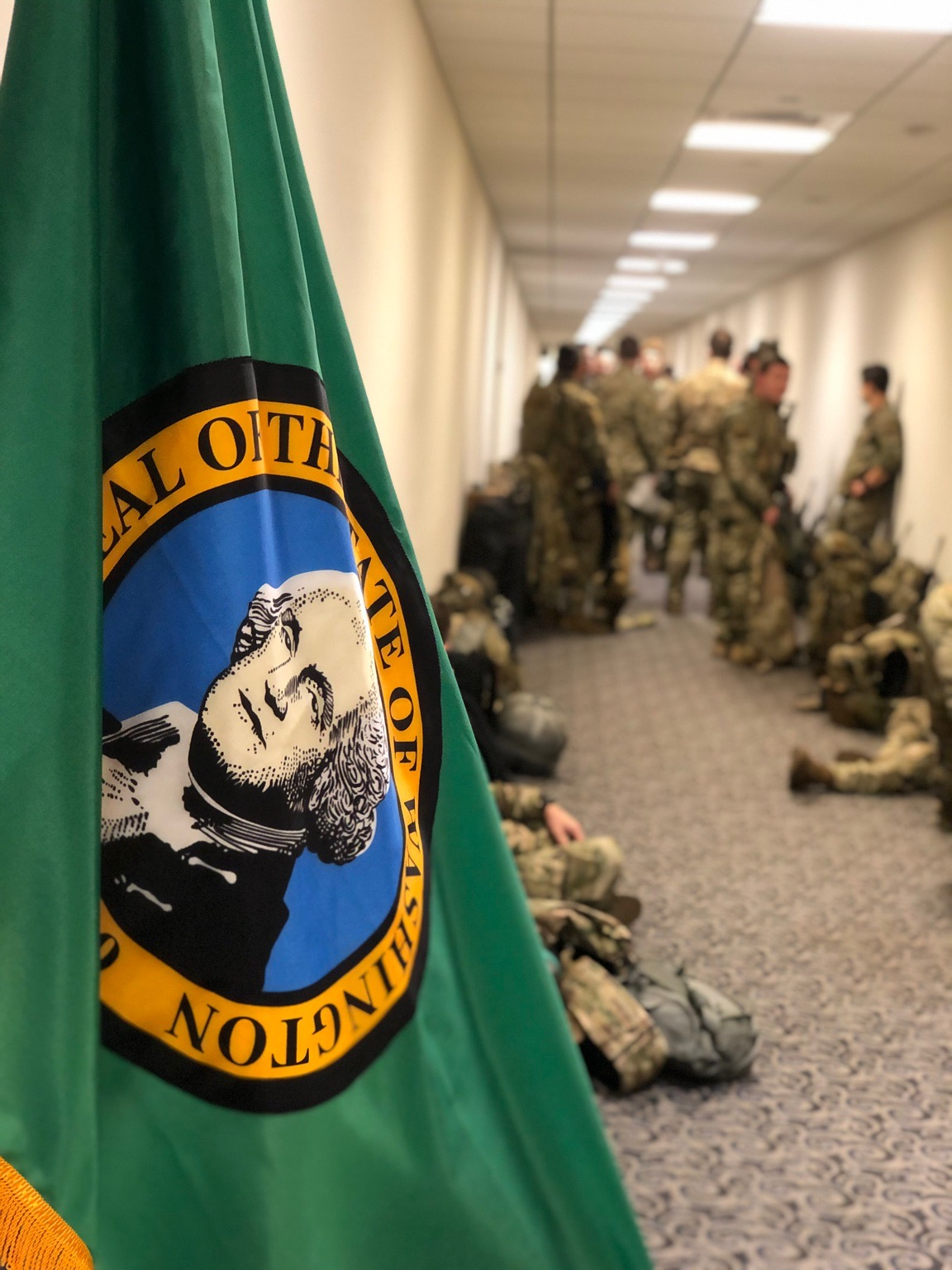
Washington Army National Guard Soldiers stand by as a quick reaction force in the Dirksen Senate Office Building during the 2021 presidential inauguration

In January 2021, the 56th TIOG established and assumed command of a 380-person joint task force composed of Washington Army and Air National Guard personnel that soon deployed as part of 25,000 National Guardsmen to Washington D.C., providing security for the 2021 Presidential Inauguration as part of Operation Capitol Response. In March of the same year, the 156th was activated to provide support to the Washington State Employment Support Department.

== See also ==
- 151st Theater Information Operations Group
- Information warfare
- List of cyber warfare forces
