= IWar =

Form of Internet-based warfare

iWar is the term used by NATO to describe a form of Internet-based warfare.

== iWar comparisons ==
iWar is distinct in that information warfare pertains to issues of intelligence, whereas cyber-warfare and cyber-terrorism pertain to issues of extelligence. These refer to degrees of sensitivity in military and infrastructure assets, battlefield communications and satellite tactical assessments. iWar refers to attacks carried out over the Internet, that target specific assets within Internet superstructure, for example: websites that provide access to online services.

== iWar attack ==
iWar has an example in having been conducted by denial-of-service attacks, using high volume bombardment during information requests, bottlenecking Internet based computer networking.

== In the future ==
The two trends of increasing vulnerability over the Internet and ease of attack make conflagration of iWar probable.

== 2008 Russia-Georgian conflict ==
The 2008 South Ossetia war heralded the arrival of iWar.

== See also ==
- Augmented reality
- Black propaganda
- Biologically Inspired Tactical Security Infrastructure
- C4ISTAR
- Command and control warfare
- Communications security
- Computer insecurity
- Disinformation
- Electronic warfare
- Information Operations Condition
- Information Operations Roadmap
- Information warfare (IW)
- Network-centric warfare
- Web brigades
