= Michael Holmes (whistleblower) =

Lieutenant Colonel Michael Holmes (born 1965), began his national service in the U.S. Army and the National Guard in 1985, and is a military intelligence officer with training in information operations. He attended Admiral Farragut Academy in St. Petersburg, Florida (1978–1980), before graduating from Marine Military Academy in Harlingen, Texas, in 1983. He graduated from the University of Texas at Austin and was commissioned a Second Lieutenant in the U.S. Army in 1987. He earned a Master of Arts in Diplomacy with a concentration in International Terrorism in 2008. He is a graduate of the U.S. Army Information Operations Qualification Course (2008), the U.S. Army Command and General Staff College (2007), the Military Intelligence Officer Transition Course (2002) and the Armor Officers Advanced Course (1994). He has served on active duty in Fort Drum, New York, as well as in both the Florida National Guard and Texas National Guard. Holmes has mobilized as a reservist in Afghanistan, Iraq, and Kosovo.

Holmes communicated alleged use of psychological operations (PSYOP) on visiting VIPs while Holmes was the leader of the Information Operations Field Support Team at Camp Eggers in Kabul, Afghanistan. Among the alleged targets were American Senators John McCain and Carl Levin, government ministers, and European diplomats. Holmes' disclosure resulted in several news articles, most notably a Rolling Stone article titled, "Another Runaway General: Army Deploys Psy-Ops on U.S. Senators" authored by Michael Hastings who recently earned fame for his reporting on General Stanley McChrystal the previous year. Hastings' article "The Run Away General" ultimately led to McChrystal's firing by President Obama. Media reports stated that the Holmes' IO unit was subjected to a retaliatory campaign when it resisted the order to influence the targets, including a subsequent reprimand against Lt. Col. Holmes.

After the Rolling Stone article was published, Gen. David Petraeus, then commander of U.S. and International Security Assistance Forces in Afghanistan, ordered an investigation to determine the legitimacy of illegal psychological operations claims made by Lt. Col Holmes as well as any retaliation for his whistleblowing. Army investigators determined Holme's claims of illegal psychological operations were “not substantiated” and there were no psychological operations units under Lt. Gen. Caldwell's command. They went on to identify Caldwell's staff was tasked with preparing “information packages” on congressional delegations and other visitors, that such a task was neither illegal nor improper, noting such a practice is common in the military. The Army was unable to later substantiate Holmes’ claim of retaliation citing insufficient evidence.
