= Information warfare =

Battlespace use and management of information and communication technology

Information warfare (IW) is the battlespace use and management of information and communication technology (ICT) in pursuit of a competitive advantage over an opponent. It is different from cyberwarfare that attacks computers, software, and command control systems. Information warfare is the manipulation of information trusted by a target without the target's awareness so that the target will make decisions against their interest but in the interest of the one conducting information warfare. As a result, it is not clear when information warfare begins, ends, and how strong or destructive it is.

Information warfare may involve the collection of tactical information, assurance(s) that one's information is valid, spreading of propaganda or disinformation to demoralize or manipulate the enemy and the public, undermining the quality of the opposing force's information, and denial of information-collection opportunities to opposing forces. Information warfare is closely linked to psychological warfare.

== Overview ==
Information warfare has been described as "the use of information to achieve our national objectives." According to NATO, "Information war is an operation conducted in order to gain an information advantage over the opponent." The term has existed at least since 1970, when Dale Minor, a reporter, published The Information War a book about propaganda and news manipulation during the Vietnam War era., although its current usage as a military capability dates from 1976, when Thomas P. Rona, then a Boeing Company engineer, referred to "information war" in a company monograph prepared for the Office of Net Assessment.

Information warfare can take many forms:

- Television, internet and radio transmission(s) can be jammed to disrupt communications, or hijacked for a disinformation campaign.
- Logistics networks can be disabled.
- Enemy communications networks can be disabled or spoofed, especially online social communities in modern days.
- Stock exchange transactions can be sabotaged, either with electronic intervention, by leaking sensitive information or by placing disinformation.
- The use of drones and other surveillance robots or webcams.
- Communication management
- Synthetic media
- The organized use of social media and other online content-generation platforms can be used to influence public perceptions.

The United States Air Force has had Information Warfare Squadrons since the 1980s. In fact, the official mission of the U.S. Air Force is now "To fly, fight and win... in air, space and cyberspace", with the latter referring to its information warfare role.

As the U.S. Air Force often risks aircraft and aircrews to attack strategic enemy communications targets, remotely disabling such targets using software and other means can provide a safer alternative. In addition, disabling such networks electronically (instead of explosively) also allows them to be quickly re-enabled after the enemy territory is occupied. Similarly, counter-information warfare units are employed to deny such capability to the enemy. The first application of these techniques was used against Iraqi communications networks in the Gulf War.

Also during the Gulf War, Dutch hackers allegedly stole information about U.S. troop movements from U.S. Defense Department computers and tried to sell it to the Iraqis, who thought it was a hoax and turned it down. In January 1999, U.S. Air Intelligence computers were hit by a coordinated attack (Moonlight Maze), part of which came from a Russian mainframe. This could not be confirmed as a Russian cyber attack due to non-attribution – the principle that online identity may not serve as proof of real-world identity.

Some militaries are now employing the use of iPhones to upload data and information gathered by drones in the same area.

== Notable examples ==
=== Chinese information warfare ===
The People's Republic of China (PRC) engages in information warfare through the People's Liberation Army (PLA) and other organizations affiliated or controlled by the Chinese Communist Party (CCP). Laid out in the Chinese Defence White Paper of 2008, informatized warfare includes the utilization of information-based weapons and forces, including battlefield management systems, precision-strike capabilities, and technology-assisted command and control (C4ISR). The term also refers to propaganda and influence operations efforts by the Chinese state. Consequential Chinese information operations have been carried out to influence Taiwanese sovereignty, U.S. elections, and the Russian invasion of Ukraine. China has also exploited artificial intelligence and increasingly complex communications structures to enhance its cyber-warfare capabilities.

=== Russo-Ukrainian War ===
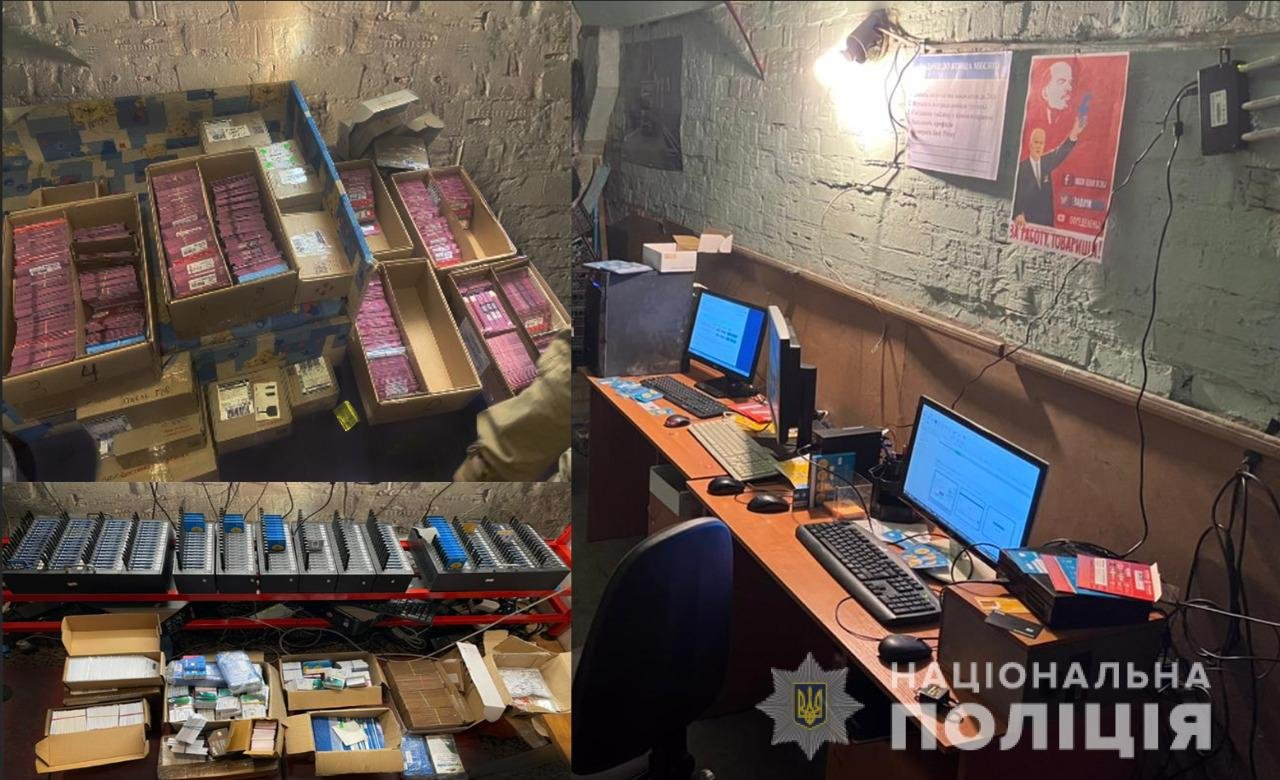
An office used by Russian web brigades captured by the Armed Forces of Ukraine during the Russian invasion of Ukraine

In 2022, the Armed Forces of Ukraine took advantage of deficiencies in Russian communications by allowing them to piggyback on Ukrainian networks, connect, and communicate. Ukrainian forces then eavesdrop and cut off Russian communications at a crucial part of the conversation. (Note: Connectivity to GLONASS may be a factor in the lack of Russian PGM availability, and the use of 3G/4G cell towers for Russian encrypted communications (Era) during the 2022 Russian invasion of Ukraine. This weakness was unearthed during the use of open communication ("Russian commanders are sometimes piggybacking on Ukrainian cell phone networks to communicate") when FSB was discussing the deaths of their generals: Vitaly Gerasimov, killed 7 Mar 2022; Andrei Sukhovetsky, killed 28 Feb 2022.)

To build support before it invaded Ukraine, Russia perpetuated a narrative that claimed the Ukrainian government was committing violence against its own Russian speaking population. By publishing large amounts of disinformation on the internet, the alternate narrative was picked up in search results, such as Google News.

=== Russian interference in foreign elections ===
Russian interference in foreign elections, most notably the Russian interference in the 2016 United States elections, has been described as information warfare. According to Microsoft, Russia also interfered in the 2024 US presidential elections. NBC also reported Russia conducting disinformation campaigns in the 2024 US elections against then US president, Joe Biden.

=== Russia vs West ===
Research suggests that Russia and the West are also engaged in an information war. For instance, Russia believes that the West is undermining its leader through the encouragement of overthrowing authoritarian regimes and liberal values. In response, Russia promotes the anti-liberal sentiments, including racism, antisemitism, homophobia, and misogyny. Russia has sought to promote the idea that the American democratic state is failing.

=== Russia, China and pro-Palestinian protests ===
The Telegraph reported in 2024 that China and Russia were promoting pro-Palestinian influencers in order to manipulate British public opinion in favor of Russian and Chinese interests. NBC reported that Russia was using different tools to cause division within the US, by delegitimizing US police operations against Pro Palestinian protests and by pivoting public conversation from the Russian invasion in Ukraine to the Israeli-Palestinian conflict. Russian media activity increased by 400% in the weeks after Hamas' Oct. 7 attack on Israel.

=== United States COVID-19 disinformation campaign ===
According to a report by Reuters, the United States ran a propaganda campaign to spread disinformation about the Sinovac Chinese COVID-19 vaccine, including using fake social media accounts to spread the disinformation that the Sinovac vaccine contained pork-derived ingredients and was therefore haram under Islamic law. The campaign was described as "payback" for COVID-19 disinformation by China directed against the U.S. The campaign ran from 2020 to mid-2021, primarily targeting people in the Philippines and used a social media hashtag for "China is the virus" in Tagalog. The primary contractor for the U.S. military on the project was General Dynamics IT, which received $493 million for its role.

=== Israeli information warfare ===
Israel has used a variety of methods to influence public opinion in recent years, from advertising and paying influencers to creating networks of websites to influence the responses of AI chatbots. According to a report by Drop Site News, Israel has launched a digital campaign to influence the response of AI systems to the Gaza war, in the form of a $46.5 million contract with Clock Tower X, a company headed by Brad Parscale, a former Trump campaign manager. The company has published hundreds of articles on a network of websites that support Israel's positions on the Gaza war, its military operations, and US-Israeli relations. The aim is to get into the data used by AI systems such as ChatGPT, Claude, and Perplexity, a method called "LLM poisoning." In an experiment conducted by Drop Site, a chatbot was asked whether increasing U.S. military cooperation with Israel would be beneficial; the chatbot answered "yes," and the first source it cited was a website that Parscale had created for the Israeli government.

== Legal and ethical concerns ==
While information warfare has yielded many advances in the types of attack that a government can make, it has also raised concerns about the moral and legal ambiguities surrounding this particularly new form of war. Traditionally, wars have been analyzed by moral scholars according to just war theory. However, with Information Warfare, Just War Theory fails because the theory is based on the traditional conception of war. Information Warfare has three main issues surrounding it compared to traditional warfare:

1. The risk for the party or nation initiating the cyberattack is substantially lower than the risk for a party or nation initiating a traditional attack. This makes it easier for governments, as well as potential terrorist or criminal organizations, to make these attacks more frequently than they could with traditional war.
2. Information communication technologies (ICT) are so immersed in the modern world that a very wide range of technologies are at risk of a cyberattack. Specifically, civilian technologies can be targeted for cyberattacks and attacks can even potentially be launched through civilian computers or websites. As such, it is harder to enforce control of civilian infrastructures than a physical space. Attempting to do so would also raise many ethical concerns about the right to privacy, making defending against such attacks even tougher.
3. The mass-integration of ICT into our system of war makes it much harder to assess accountability for situations that may arise when using robotic and/or cyber attacks. For robotic weapons and automated systems, it's becoming increasingly hard to determine who is responsible for any particular event that happens. This issue is exacerbated in the case of cyberattacks, as sometimes it is virtually impossible to trace who initiated the attack in the first place.

Recently, legal concerns have arisen centered on these issues, specifically the issue of the right to privacy in the United States of America. Lt. General Keith B. Alexander, who served as the head of Cyber Command under President Barack Obama, noted that there was a "mismatch between our technical capabilities to conduct operations and the governing laws and policies" when writing to the Senate Armed Services Committee. A key point of concern was the targeting of civilian institutions for cyberattacks, to which the general promised to try to maintain a mindset similar to that of traditional war, in which they will seek to limit the impact on civilians.

== See also ==
- Active measures
- Black propaganda
- Character assassination
- Cyberwarfare
- Communications security
- Command and control warfare
- Disinformation
- Electronic warfare
- Historical revisionism
- Historical negationism
- Fake news
- Fifth Dimension Operations
- Gatekeeper (politics)
- Industrial espionage
- Information assurance
- Information operations
- Internet manipulation
- Irregular warfare
- iWar
- Kompromat
- List of cyber warfare forces
- Memetic warfare
- Network-centric warfare
- New generation warfare
- Political warfare
- Propaganda
- Psychological warfare
- Public affairs (military)
- Public relations
- Storm botnet
- Transparency

Group specific:

- Chinese information operations and information warfare
- Cyberwarfare in Russia
- Taliban propaganda
- White Paper on El Salvador

US specific:

- Active Measures Working Group
- CIA
- COINTELPRO
- Edward Bernays
- Enemy Image, a documentary about the Pentagon's approach to news coverage of war
- Information Operations Roadmap
- Information Operations (United States)
- Pentagon military analyst program
- State-sponsored Internet propaganda
- Titan Rain

== Bibliography ==
=== Books ===
- Jerome Clayton Glenn, "Future Mind" Chapter 9. Defense p. 195-201. Acropolis Books LTD, Washington, DC (1989)
- Winn Schwartau, "Information Warfare: Chaos on the Electronic Superhighway" Thunder's Mouth Press (1993)
- Winn Schwartau, ed, Information Warfare: Cyberterrorism: Protecting your personal security in the electronic age, Thunder's Mouth Press, 2nd ed, (1996) (ISBN 1560251328).
- John Arquilla and David Ronfeldt, In Athena's Camp, RAND (1997).
- Dorothy Denning, Information Warfare and Security, Addison-Wesley (1998) (ISBN 0201433036).
- James Adams, The Next World War: Computers are the Weapons and the Front line is Everywhere, Simon and Schuster (1998) (ISBN 0684834529).
- Edward Waltz, Information Warfare Principles and Operations, Artech House, 1998, ISBN 0-89006-511-X
- John Arquilla and David Ronfeldt, Networks and Netwars: The Future of Terror, Crime, and Militancy, RAND (2001) (ISBN 0833030302).
- Ishmael Jones, The Human Factor: Inside the CIA's Dysfunctional Intelligence Culture, Encounter Books, New York (2010) (ISBN 978-1594032233). Information/intelligence warfare.
- Gregory J. Rattray, Strategic Warfare in Cyberspace, MIT Press (2001) (ISBN 0262182092).
- Anthony H. Cordesman, Cyber-threats, Information Warfare, and Critical Infrastructure Protection: DEFENDING THE US HOMELAND (2002) (ISBN 0275974235).
- Leigh Armistead, Information Operations: The Hard Reality of Soft Power, Joint Forces Staff College and the National Security Agency (2004) (ISBN 1574886991).
- Thomas Rid, War and Media Operations: The US Military and the Press from Vietnam to Iraq, Routledge (2007) (ISBN 0415416590).

=== Other ===
- Science at War: Information Warfare, The History Channel (1998).
