= Computer network operations =

Computer network operations (CNO) is a broad term that has both military and civilian application. Conventional wisdom is that information is power, and more and more of the information necessary to make decisions is digitized and conveyed over an ever-expanding network of computers and other electronic devices. Computer network operations are deliberate actions taken to leverage and optimize these networks to improve human endeavor and enterprise or, in warfare, to gain information superiority and deny the enemy this enabling capability.

== In the military domain ==
Within the United States military domain, CNO is considered one of five core capabilities under Information Operations (IO) Information Warfare. The other capabilities are Psychological Operations (PSYOP), Military Deception (MILDEC), Operations Security (OPSEC) and Electronic Warfare (EW). Other national military organizations may use different designations.

Computer Network Operations, in concert with electronic warfare (EW), is used primarily to disrupt, disable, degrade or deceive an enemy's command and control, thereby crippling the enemy's ability to make effective and timely decisions, while simultaneously protecting and preserving friendly command and control. Full Spectrum Cyberspace Operations (CNO: CNA, CND & CNE) was conceived and written by Mr. Donald A. Tyler the RCERT Branch Chief under the Land Information Warfare Activity (LIWA) Command ADCON to HQ INSCOM responsible for the Global Regional Computer Emergency Response Team (RCERT) in 1999 through 2000 as the fifth pillar of IO and indoctrinated into the Joint Publications that change the history of Warfare across the Glob. Systems and Networks are a primary war fighting tactical advantage across ALL OS.

== Types of military CNO ==
According to Joint Pub 3-13, CNO consists of computer network attack (CNA), computer network defense (CND) and computer network exploitation (CNE).

- Computer network attack (CNA): Includes actions taken via computer networks to disrupt, deny, degrade, or destroy the information within computers and computer networks and/or the computers/networks themselves.
- Computer network defense (CND): Includes actions taken via computer networks to protect, monitor, analyze, detect and respond to network attacks, intrusions, disruptions or other unauthorized actions that would compromise or cripple defense information systems and networks. Joint Pub 6.0 further outlines Computer Network Defense as an aspect of NetOps:
- Computer network exploitation (CNE): Includes enabling actions and intelligence collection via computer networks that exploit data gathered from target or enemy information systems or networks.

== See also ==
- Cyberwarfare in the United States
- Chinese information operations and information warfare
- Cyberwarfare by Russia
