= Information Operations Roadmap =

USA Pentagon Military Visioning (2003-2006)

The Information Operations Roadmap is a document commissioned by the Pentagon in 2003 and declassified in January 2006. The document was personally approved by former Secretary of Defense Donald Rumsfeld, and describes the United States Military's approach to Information operations, with an emphasis on the Internet.

== See also ==
- Computer network operations
- Electronic warfare
- Military deception
- Operations security
- Propaganda
- Psychological operations (United States)
- Psychological warfare
- War on terrorism
