= B'nai Israel =

B'nai Israel (Hebrew: בני ישראל 'Sons/Children of Israel') is the name of several Jewish communities and synagogues:

== Synagogues ==
=== Canada ===
- Congregation B'nai Israel (St. Catharines), Ontario

=== United States ===
(by state then city)

==== California ====
- Congregation B'nai Israel (Daly City, California), the only Karaite congregation in the United States
- Congregation B'nai Israel (Sacramento, California)
- Congregation B'nai Israel (Jackson, California), building demolished in 1948

==== Connecticut ====
- Congregation B'nai Israel (Bridgeport, Connecticut)
- Temple B'Nai Israel (New Britain, Connecticut)

==== Georgia ====
- B'nai Israel Synagogue and Cemetery (Thomasville, Georgia)

==== Illinois ====
- Anshe Sholom B'nai Israel (Chicago, Illinois)

==== Indiana ====
- B'nai Israel Synagogue (South Bend, Indiana)

==== Iowa ====
- B'nai Israel Synagogue (Council Bluffs, Iowa)

==== Louisiana ====
- B'nai Israel Traditional Synagogue (Alexandria, Louisiana)

==== Maryland ====
- B'nai Israel Congregation (Rockville, Maryland)
- B'nai Israel Synagogue (Baltimore, Maryland)

==== Mississippi ====
- Temple B'nai Israel (Tupelo, Mississippi)
- Temple B'nai Israel (Natchez, Mississippi), a Mississippi Landmark

==== Missouri ====
- B'Nai Israel Synagogue (Cape Girardeau, Missouri)

==== New Jersey ====
- Congregation B'nai Israel (Millburn, New Jersey)

==== New Mexico ====
- Congregation B'nai Israel (Albuquerque, New Mexico)

==== New York ====
- Bikur Cholim B'nai Israel Synagogue, (Swan Lake, New York)
- B'nai Israel Synagogue (Woodbourne, New York)
- Congregation B'nai Israel Synagogue, (Fleischmanns, New York)
- Temple B'Nai Israel (Olean, New York)

==== North Dakota ====
- B'nai Israel Synagogue and Montefiore Cemetery, (Grand Forks, North Dakota)

==== Ohio ====
- Kahal Kadosh Bene Israel (Cincinnati, Ohio)
- Congregation B'nai Israel (Toledo, Ohio)

==== Oklahoma ====
- Temple B'nai Israel (Oklahoma City)

==== Pennsylvania ====
- Congregation B'nai Israel (Pittsburgh, Pennsylvania)

==== Tennessee ====
- Temple B'Nai Israel (Jackson, Tennessee)

==== Texas ====
- Congregation B'nai Israel (Galveston, Texas)

==== Utah ====
- B'nai Israel Temple (Salt Lake City)

== See also ==
- Banu Israil, Muslim community of India
- Ben Yehuda (disambiguation)
- Bar Yehuda
- Ben-Israel
- Beth Israel (disambiguation)
