= Israel (disambiguation) =

Israel is a country in West Asia.

Israel may also refer to:

== Geography ==
- Land of Israel, a Jewish name for the region between the Mediterranean Sea and the Jordan River
- Ancient Israel and Judah, an Iron Age civilization
  - Kingdom of Israel (united monarchy) (c. 1047–930 BCE), a Biblical state
  - Kingdom of Israel (Samaria) (c. 930–720 BCE), the northern Israelite kingdom

== People ==
- Israel (name), a biblical given name and family name
  - Jacob, a biblical patriarch who was later given the name of Israel
- Twelve Tribes of Israel, descendants of the 12 sons of Jacob in the Hebrew Bible
- Israelites (or the Children of Israel), the confederated Twelve Tribes
- Jews as a people, or Am Yisrael, an ethnoreligious group, originating from the Israelites
- Israelis, the citizens and nationals of the State of Israel

== Media ==
- Israel (album), a 1968 studio album by American musicians Kai Winding and J. J. Johnson
- "Israel" (Bee Gees song), a 1972 single by the British music group
- "Israel" (composition), a 1949 composition by American musician John Carisi
- "Israel" (Siouxsie and the Banshees song), a 1980 single by the British rock band
- "Israel" (Al Be Back and Kanye West song)
- "Israel", a song by Irving Berlin
- "Israel", a song by British singer Morrissey from his 2017 album Low in High School
- Israel Vibration, a Jamaican reggae group
- Israël (magazine), a Zionist publication in Egypt (1920–1939)

== See also ==
- Izrael (disambiguation)
- Israeli (disambiguation)
- Israelite (disambiguation)
- Jezreel (disambiguation)
- Children of Israel (disambiguation)
- Kingdom of Israel (disambiguation)
- Beth Israel (disambiguation)
- Judah (disambiguation)
- Palestine (disambiguation)
