= Hebrew (disambiguation) =

Hebrew is a language native to Israel.

Hebrew may also refer to:

== Language ==
- A form of the Hebrew language:
  - Biblical Hebrew
  - Modern Hebrew
- The Hebrew alphabet, used to write Hebrew and other Jewish languages
  - Hebrew (Unicode block), a block of Hebrew characters in Unicode.

== Education ==
- Hebrew College, in Massachusetts, United States
- Hebrew University of Jerusalem, in Israel

== Moths ==
- Hebrew moth, or Polygrammate hebraeicum
- Hebrew character, or Orthosia gothica
- Setaceous Hebrew character, or Xestia c-nigrum

== Other uses ==
- Epistle to the Hebrews, abbreviated as Hebrews, a book of the Bible
- Hebrews, a term for the Israelites and Jews
- He'Brew, a brand of beer
- Haivrit, an Israeli rock band whose name means "The Hebrew"

== See also ==
- Hebrew Israelites (disambiguation)
- Ivry (disambiguation)
- Semitic (disambiguation)
