= History of the Jews in Lithuania =

Lithuanian Jews
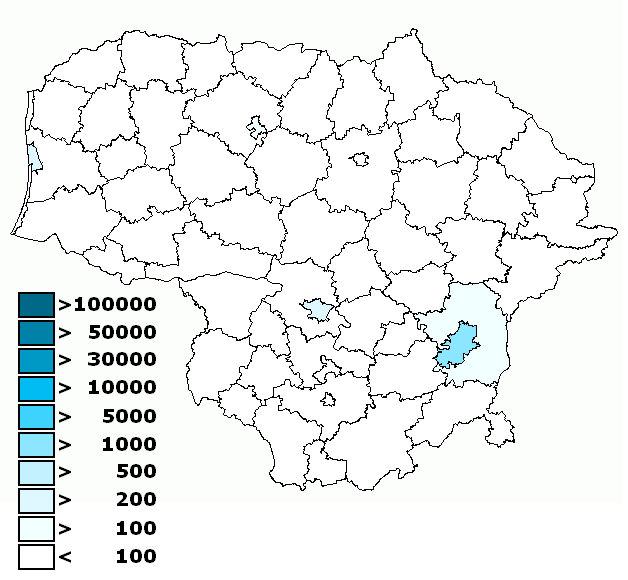

Regions with significant populations
- Lithuania: 2,256 Jews and 192 Karaim as of the 2021 census

Languages
- Yiddish, Hebrew, Russian, Polish, and Lithuanian

Religion
- Judaism

Related ethnic groups
- Jews, Ashkenazi Jews, Belarusian Jews, Russian Jews, Latvian Jews, Ukrainian Jews, Estonian Jews, Polish Jews

The history of the Jews in Lithuania spans the period from the 14th century to the present day. There is still a small community in the country, as well as an extensive Lithuanian Jewish diaspora in Israel, the United States, South Africa, and other countries.

== Early history ==
The origin of the Jews of Lithuania has been a subject of much speculation. The first reliable document attesting to the presence of Jews within the Grand Duchy of Lithuania is the charter of 1388 granting privileges to the Jews of Trakai. The gathering together of the scattered Jewish settlers in sufficient numbers and with enough power to form communities and to obtain privileges from their Lithuanian rulers implies the lapse of considerable time from the first migrations. Therefore, various historians attempted to claim that Jews migrated to Lithuania earlier. For example, Abraham Harkavy (1835–1919) claimed that the first Jews migrated in the 10th century from the Khazar Khaganate (see also Khazar hypothesis of Ashkenazi ancestry). Other historians claim that Jews migrated from Germany in the 12th century. German Jews were persecuted during the era of the crusades. The traditional language of the vast majority of Jews of Lithuania, Yiddish, is based largely upon the Medieval German spoken by the western Germanic Jewish immigrants. Another theory is that Jews migrated during the reign of Grand Duke Gediminas (reigned 1316–1341) attracted by his invitation of merchants and craftspeople in 1323–1324 and economic opportunities – at the time, Lithuania had no cities in the western sense of the word, no Magdeburg Rights or closed guilds. In the 14th century, the Grand Duchy of Lithuania expanded into Galicia–Volhynia (see Galicia–Volhynia Wars) and the Principality of Kiev (see Battle on the Irpin River and Battle of Blue Waters), territories already inhabited by Jews.

=== The Charter of 1388 ===
Duke Vytautas granted privileges to the Jews of Trakai on June 24, 1388. Later, similar privileges were granted to the Jews of Brest (July 1, 1388), Grodno (1389), Lutsk, Vladimir, and other large towns. The charter was modeled upon similar documents granted by Casimir III, and earlier by Bolesław of Kalisz, to the Jews in Poland in 1264. Therefore, it seems more than likely that influential Polish Jews cooperated with the leading Lithuanian communities in securing the charters from Vytautas.

Under the charter, the Lithuanian Jews formed a class of freemen subject in all criminal cases directly to the jurisdiction of the grand duke and his official representatives, and in petty suits to the jurisdiction of local officials on an equal footing with the lesser nobles (szlachta), boyars, and other free citizens. The official representatives of the Polish king and the grand duke were the voivode (palatine) in Poland and the elder (starosta) in Lithuania, who were known as the "judge of the Jews" (judex Judæorum), and their deputies. The judge of the Jews decided all cases between Christians and Jews and all criminal suits in which Jews were concerned; in civil suits, however, he acted only on the application of the interested parties. Either party that failed to obey the judge's summons had to pay him a fine. To him also belonged all fines collected from Jews for minor offenses. His duties included the guardianship of the persons, property, and freedom of worship of the Jews. He had no right to summon anyone to his court except upon the complaint of an interested party. In matters of religion, the Jews were given extensive autonomy.

Under these equitable laws the Jews of Lithuania reached a degree of prosperity unknown to their Polish and German co-religionists at that time. The communities of Brest, Grodno, Trakai, Lutsk, and Minsk rapidly grew in wealth and influence. Every community had at its head a Jewish elder. These elders represented the communities in all external relations, in securing new privileges, and in the regulation of taxes. Such officials are not, however, referred to by the title "elder" before the end of the 16th century. Up to that time the documents merely state, for instance, that the "Jews of Brest humbly apply," etc. On assuming office the elders declared under oath that they would discharge the duties of the position faithfully, and would relinquish the office at the expiration of the appointed term. The elder acted in conjunction with the rabbi, whose jurisdiction included all Jewish affairs with the exception of judicial cases assigned to the court of the deputy, and by the latter to the king. In religious affairs, however, an appeal from the decision of the rabbi and the elder was permitted only to a council consisting of the chief rabbis of the king's cities. The cantor, sexton, and shochet were subject to the orders of the rabbi and elder.

=== Vytautas The Great (1392–1430) ===
The goodwill and tolerance of Vytautas endeared him to his Jewish subjects, and for a long time traditions concerning his generosity and nobility of character were current among them. His cousin, the king of Poland Jogaila, did not interfere with his administration during Vytautas's lifetime. Vytautas sought to create a middle class of traders and merchants during his reign and for this purpose he preferred Jews over Germans or Poles because he viewed them as more loyal. To help the Jewish community he intervened on their behalf several times so that Jewish traders could travel to places where they were otherwise banned such as Danzig. Vytautas's tolerance led to a golden age of Judaism in Lithuania with many Jews from Switzerland, Flanders, France, Spain, Bohemia, and the Holy Roman Empire migrating to Lithuania in search of religious freedom and trade opportunities.

The reign of Vytautas saw the beginnings of the Karaite community in Lithuania. According to Karaite oral histories the first Karaites in Lithuania were several Tatar families captured as prisoners of war by Vytautas and resettled in Lithuania. The Karaite vernacular was Tatar but used Hebrew as a liturgical language and was differentiated from the rest of Jewish community by their distinctive religious practices and culture. Vytautas referred to the Karaites as "Jews of Trakai" (Latin: Judaei Troceuses) and they were considered Jews, but the Karaites themselves insisted they were not Jewish and fought for separate legal autonomy and rights from the Jews. Despite this, the Jewish and Karaite communities of Lithuania had good relations and were very connected physically, legally, and institutionally. They shared religious facilities, several religious texts, and yeshivot. As such the history of the Lithuanian Karaites is inseparable from the history of the Lithuanian Jews.

== Jagiellon rule ==
In 1569, Poland and Lithuania were united (Union of Lublin). It was generally a time of prosperity and relative safety for the Jews of both countries (with the exception of the 17th-century Khmelnytsky Uprising). However, a few events, such as the expulsion of the Jews from the Grand Duchy of Lithuania between 1495 and 1503 occurred just within Lithuania.

=== Casimir IV (1440–1492) ===
By the time of Casimir IV's reign the two Jewish population centers in Lithuania were Trakai and Lutsk, while the primary intellectual and religious center was Kiev, and the Jews primarily spoke the Yiddish, Ruthenian, and Tatar languages. The community was primarily Ashkenazi with a Sephardi minority though the two communities appeared to have gotten along well.

Casimir IV was religiously mentored by the antisemitic Cardinal Zbigniew Oleśnick, despite this in 1453 he confirmed the 1388 charter and promised them continued liberty and safety but this move was heavily opposed by the Catholic Church and Cardinal Oleśnick. The Polish Church's opposition was mostly caused by the presence of John of Capistrano who blamed the Jews for the epidemic of 1464 as well as several military defeats of Polish and Lithuanian forces against the Muscovites. Due to this pressure Casimir issued the Statute of Nieszawa which nullified the Jews' extra privileges. Despite this statute the rights of Jews stayed the same as before.

Casimir's reign also saw Jews begin to ascend socially in Lithuania. Casimir fired Jews as financiers, allowed them to become farmers, appointed them as customs inspectors, allowed them to trade freely, and allowed them to collect tolls. This saw a small percentage of the Jews transform into a rich and elitist group which imitated the rich's lifestyle most importantly by sending their children abroad for study. Though these Jews were disliked by the clergy, burghers, and petty nobility. As well as this social climb there was a population increase as Casimir expanded his lands and thus acquired new Jewish subjects within his new lands the old laws were generally unchanged and things became more politically centralized. Some Lithuanian Jews individually also rose to become quite important even compared to the other noble Jews including: Rabbi Moishe Hagoleh, Daniel and Ze'ev of Trakai who were important farms, and Moishe of Trakai who was an important businessman. After his death Casimir was greatly mourned by the Jews of Poland and Lithuania.

=== Alexander Jagiellon (1492-1506) ===
Casimir was succeeded as king of Poland by his son John Albert, and on the Lithuanian throne by his younger son, Alexander Jagiellon. The latter confirmed the charter of privileges granted to the Jews by his predecessors, and even gave them additional rights. His father's Jewish creditors received part of the sums due to them, the rest being withheld under various pretexts. The favorable attitude toward the Jews which had characterized the Lithuanian rulers for generations was unexpectedly and radically changed by a decree promulgated by Alexander in April 1495. By this decree all Jews and Karaites living in Lithuania proper and the adjacent territories were summarily ordered to leave the country.

Historian Simon Dubnow states there were 3 main reasons for the expulsion:

1. Catholic pressure, which was extra strong due to the expulsion of the Jews of Spain in 1492 and the expulsion of the Portuguese Jews in 1495.
2. The influence of Alexander Jagiellon's wife, Helena of Moscow.
3. The desire of the nobility to rid themselves of their debts by getting rid of the Jews they owed those debts to.

As part of the expulsion, it was decided that Jews who converted to Christianity would be allowed to stay, and this option was taken by several influential Jewish families.

The expulsion was evidently not accompanied by the usual cruelties; for there was no popular animosity toward the Lithuanian Jews, and the decree was regarded as an act of mere willfulness on the part of an absolute ruler. Some of the nobility, however, approved Alexander's decree, expecting to profit by the departure of their Jewish creditors, as is indicated by numerous lawsuits on the return of the exiles to Lithuania in 1503. It is known from the Hebrew sources that some of the exiles migrated to Crimea, and that by far the greater number settled in Poland, where, by permission of King John I Albert, they established themselves in towns situated near the Lithuanian boundary. This permission, given at first for a period of two years, was extended "because of the extreme poverty of the Jews on account of the great losses sustained by them." The extension, which applied to all the towns of the kingdom, accorded the enjoyment of all the liberties that had been granted to their Polish brethren (Kraków, June 29, 1498). The expelled Karaites settled in the Polish town of Ratne, now in Ukraine.

Alexander Jagiellon after much delay incorporated the previously annulled Charter of 1388 into law on October 25, 1500; as by 1500 the nobility and monarchy had accepted that they had to allow the Jews to return and were drafting legislation to do so. They needed to allow for their return because Lithuania was not financially stable enough without them, especially because the state exchequer and the nobility were monetarily drained from wars with Muscovy and the Ottoman Empire.

Soon after in 1503, Alexander permitted the Jewish exiles to return to Lithuania. Beginning in March 1503, as is shown by documents still extant, their houses, lands, synagogues, and cemeteries were returned to them, and permission was granted them to collect their old debts. The new charter of privileges permitted them to live throughout Lithuania as before. The return of the Jews and their attempt to regain their old possessions led to many difficulties and lawsuits. Alexander found it necessary to issue an additional decree (April 1503), directing his vice-regent to enforce the law. In spite of this some of the property was not recovered by the Jews for years. After their return the Jews resumed their previous positions as tax farmers, toll collectors, money lenders, and landlords, with many also moving to riverside areas due to better business opportunities there.

=== The Reformation ===
Literacy at this time was reserved for three groups: the upper classes, the nobility, and the Jews. Almost all Lithuanian Jews could both speak and write in Yiddish, while many men were also literate in Hebrew. Literate Jews and the clergy had no shortage of work as scribes, because the majority of Poles, Lithuanians, and Russians could not read or write.

At the same time, the middle of the 16th century witnessed a growing antagonism between the lesser nobility and the Jews. Their relations became strained, and the enmity of the Christians began to disturb the life of the Lithuanian Jews. The anti-Jewish feeling, due at first to economic causes engendered by competition, was fostered by the clergy, who were then engaged in a crusade against heretics, notably the Lutherans, Calvinists, and Jews. The Reformation, which had spread from Germany, tended to weaken the allegiance to the Roman Catholic Church. While the Counter-Reformation and the Polish churches fear of minorities who followed other denominations led to a rise in a bigotry which affected all minorities (Germans, Ukrainians, Belarusians, Russians) but none more so than the Jews.

The Lithuanian reformation was ambivalent towards the Jews at best, they targeted and mistreated Jews in equal measure compared to other religious groups and they proselytized at the Jews with the same intensity as the Catholics. In response to this the Jew community invested in the consolidation of their own schools and community institutions. Jewish educational institutions proliferated during this time. Taking advantage of the strife among the Christians the Jews took this opportunity to strengthen their internal institutions and society, while simultaneously building closer relations with Jews in Turkey, the Land of Israel, and the rest of Europe.

=== The Act of 1566 ===
Frequent instances occurred of the marriage of Catholic women to Jews, Turks, or Tatars. The Bishop of Vilnius complained to Sigismund August (Dec., 1548) of the frequency of such mixed marriages and of the education of the offspring in their fathers' faiths. The shlyakhta also saw in the Jews dangerous competitors in commercial and financial undertakings. In their dealings with the agricultural classes the lords preferred the Jews as middlemen, thus creating a feeling of injury on the part of the szlachta. The exemption of the Jews from military service and the power and wealth of the Jewish tax-farmers intensified the resentment of the szlachta. Members of the nobility, like Borzobogaty, Zagorovski, and others, attempted to compete with the Jews as leaseholders of customs revenues, but were never successful. Since the Jews lived in the towns and on the lands of the king, the nobility could not wield any authority over them nor derive profit from them. They had not even the right to settle Jews on their estates without the permission of the king; but, on the other hand, they were often annoyed by the erection on their estates of the toll houses of the Jewish tax-collectors.

Hence when the favorable moment arrived, the Lithuanian nobility endeavored to secure greater power over the Jews. At the Diet of Vilna in 1551 the nobility urged the imposition of a special poll tax of one ducat per head, and the Volhynian nobles demanded that the Jewish tax-collectors be forbidden to erect tollhouses or place guards at the taverns on their estates.

The opposition to the Jews was finally crystallized and found definite expression in the repressive Lithuanian statute of 1566, when the Lithuanian nobles were first allowed to take part in the national legislation. Paragraph Twelve of this statute contains the following articles:

"The Jews shall not wear costly clothing, nor gold chains, nor shall their wives wear gold or silver ornaments. The Jews shall not have silver mountings on their sabers and daggers; they shall be distinguished by characteristic clothes; they shall wear yellow caps, and their wives kerchiefs of yellow linen, in order that all may be enabled to distinguish Jews from Christians."

Other restrictions of a similar nature are contained in the same paragraph. However, the king checked the desire of the nobility to modify essentially the old charters of the Jews.

== In the Polish–Lithuanian Commonwealth ==
=== Henry of Valois (1573-1574) ===
Sigismund Augustus died without leaving an heir in 1572, plunging Lithuania into a period of anarchy. In order to restore order and prevent a civil war, a new monarch, the pretender Henry of Valois, Duke of Anjou, was chosen. In France, Henry had been a fanatical Catholic who had killed thousands of Huguenots, but in his new role as King of the Commonwealth, Henry gave complete religious freedom to all Christians and later all people in his realm. He reconfirmed Jewish legal privileges as well as their exclusive right to mint coins of Sigismund. His motives for this were that he needed to secure allies in his competition over the Polish throne with Ivan the Terrible. After only 13 months he decided he preferred France to the Commonwealth, which he viewed as barbarous, and returned to France.

=== Stephen Báthory (1575-1586) ===
Stephen Báthory was similar to his short ruled predecessor Henry the Third in that they both looked to the Jewish community to help Lithuania recover from the ongoing political instability and financial issues. Stephen was also a reformer which included improving the Vilnius education system by summoning Jewish intellectual to teach there. He also granted concession to the Zaporozhian Cossacks and the Jews, with Stephen being so eager to encourage Jewish merchants that he restricted the trading rights of 30,000 Scottish merchants active in Poland and Lithuania. Indeed under his rule the Jews were the most favored they had ever been.

=== The Council of Four Lands ===
In 1581, King Stephen took what was at the time the most pro-Jewish action yet; he endorsed the Jewish Parliament known as the Council of Four Lands, with the titular four lands being Lithuania, Lesser Poland, Greater Poland, and Belorussia. The council had existed since 1534 and had exercised power before this endorsement, but this was still a massive boost to the organization. The council was not intended to replace the previous communal organization which existed in those four regions known as the Kehillot. The government fully supported the work of the council and recognized its power; this led to a mutually beneficial relationship in which the Council took over responsibilities for taxing the Jews and managing their own internal affairs, while in exchange the Jews were given government endorsed autonomy, a unifying force, and a maintainer of law and order. Later on as Jewish communities spread it also became beneficial for the Jews to be able to interact with the government as one united group rather than the government having to manage relations with many smaller communities.

The conceptual roots of the council were distinctly Jewish, an outgrowth of the beis dins which convened in the fairs on market days to settle disputes. These local ad hoc systems eventually grew into centralized regional rabbinical courts. With four of these courts, each based in a large city and with substantial financial backing from various wealthy and or powerful Jews formed the basis of the council. The Lithuanian one of these councils, the Jewish Regional Council had been founded in 1520. The council would meet twice a year in Poland and in Lithuania; while three ledgers would be kept in Grodno, Brest-Litovsk, and Vilnius. Each community sent voting delegates to the Council where they would deal with issues that affected the entire nation, while the Kahals would retain autonomy in their own affairs. By 1590 the united Council had grown impractical, given their differing power dynamics and needs the Lithuanian Council was split off into the Council of Lithuania. Going forward the Lithuanian and Polish council would be in constant conflict with each other over issues such as cost sharing, boundary disputes, and commercial rights. While the Lithuanian Council relied on the Poland Council at the same time for the Polish Council was able to directly lobby the central government.

After it broke away, the Council of Lithuania met 37 times between 1623 and 1764, every 2–3 years with venue decided by circumstance. All householders were entitled to participate in the elections, but few met this requirement and fewer exercised the right to vote. By its end only 1% of Lithuanian Jews voted, though this rate was 7–20 times higher in the 5 principal cities of Lithuania: Brest-Litovsk, Pinsk, Vilnius, Slutzk, and Gardinas. Elections were held during the middle 4 days of Passover to encourage maximum turnout. The leadership of Lithuanian Jewry was oligarchic, with community leaders cracked down on any opposition with the support of the council, often using the power of the Herem to ensure compliance. The Councils in both Poland and Lithuania kept ledgers of their meetings and while the Polish ledgers have been mostly lost the Lithuanian ones have survived from the years 1623 to the council's abolition in 1764.

The Lithuanian Council exercised its power in many fields of Lithuanian Jewish life. As early as 1600 it issues ordinances regulating the religious behavior of the Jews in both their personal lives and in their interactions with non-Jews, working to maintain religious observance and safeguard both personal and communal reputations. In its interactions with the state, it worked to protect the Jewish communities in relation to the federal government, while the Councils Dayanim served as arbiters in disputes between communities. The council also passed legislation on lease holding and issues taxes. But the council's most important work was its creation of Jewish Autonomist legislation. In education and culture, the Council strongly encouraged the publication of books as well as the spread of Rabbis and Yeshivas.

While there were exceptions, most Jews took pride in the council's work and respected their authority in religious, economic, social, and educational areas. The Jewish community of this time was most motivated by spiritual commitment and moral discipline, with this intangible motivation providing the community and the council with the power and influence that enabled them to lead the Jewish community.

=== Sigismund III Vasa (1587-1632) ===
Sigismund III Vasa came to power after Báthory's death while preparing for war with the Ottoman Empire. In 1589 he accepted the Third Lithuanian Statute. This was important because while the statute said little about the Jews in particular it would form the basis of Lithuanian law and thus Jewish life in Lithuania until 1840, but under his reign the Liberum veto (English: Free Veto) which allowed any noble to declare a veto and thus kill any piece of legislation, over time this would prove to become the death of the Polish-Lithuanian Commonwealth.

Sigismund was born to Protestant father in a Protestant country but because of his Catholic mother he became a zealous Catholic; because of this he encouraged a new era of Catholic zealotry which led to the Jesuits being given a Carte Blanche (English: Blank Check) to proselytize via sermons, processions, and holding mass. Sigismund allowed the Jesuits to expand their power and helped by appointing the Jesuit Piotr Skarga as court preacher and rector of the University of Vilnius, he also allowed the Jesuits to continue their ongoing efforts to squash the growing renaissance and Humanist movements. Most importantly for the Jews he helped the Jesuits in their ongoing mission to persecute heretics; which included: Protestants, those who still practiced Pagan customs, and above all Jews. Symptomatic of this new era, in May 1592 a mob led by Jesuit inspired burghers attacked Jewish properties, homes, and the synagogue in Vilnius. The Lithuanian Trubinal sentenced some participants to prison sentences and ordered the payment of 13,500 Shoks to the Jewish community as reparation but since the court had no power to enforce this, and those that could enforce it refused to do so the mob got away without anyone being sent to prison and no reparations being paid.

Since the mid-1500s the Commonwealth had gradually been expanding into modern day Ukraine and Belarus, and the Jews became valuable partner to the nobility in their development of these regions, with some Jews were even being allowed to own land. While many Jews still worked as money lenders, tax collectors, peddlers, or brokers; many others began to work in agriculture, crafts, dyeing, forestry, horse and cattle farming. Jewish communities spread out over the new territories and they were given the rights to brew and distill alcohol. Despite their cooperation, the Jews were still socially inferior to the Nobility; they served as middle men with the nobles and wealthy on one side and the Ukrainian peasantry on the other. In the future this would cause major problems for the Jews. During the Polish–Russian War (1609–1618) the Jews served a very important financiers for the Commonwealth with the brothers Eliezer and Samuel Ben Moshe being the most important ones. They also served as important financiers during the Smolensk War.

In spite of Jewish influence the Jewish Charter renewed in 1629 and Jewish rights were actually expanded. Jews could now only be summoned to the Fortress or Royal Courts which circumvented the antisemitism of the lower courts, they were made exempt from surtaxes, they were allowed the expand their cemeteries, slaughterhouses, mikvehs and this strengthened the community. Three years later in May 1632, Sigismund issued an injunction against violence against Jews and interfering with their businesses. He also advised the Burghers that they should seek arbitration rather than litigation in disputes with Jews to avoid burdening the legal system.

=== Ladislaus IV Vasa (1632-1648) ===
Ladislaus greatly employed Jews and accordingly reconfirmed their charter in 1644 while also empowered the Appeals Court made up of him and his ministers to intervene in cases to protect the Jews from any assailant, including the Burghers and Nobility. He then enacted an ordinance (1644–45) which gave the Jews the right to deal in skins, clothes, linen, furs, silver, gold, mead, flax, animal fat, and spices on behalf of the nobility. The Jews of Vilnius also gained new freedoms in crafts, guilds, and small industry which spread to the rest of Lithuanian Jewry. Ladislaus also ordered the municipalities to protect Jews from violence.

At the same time Ladislaus also restricted the rights of Jews in other areas. They weren't allowed the sell cattle on other behalf, they could only sell alcohol to Christians wholesale and in cities, when working for Christians they could only work in specialized trades with no guild such as jewelry, furs, and glass. These changes ghettoized the Jews, banning them from rented or buying houses outside of their area of residence. The reason given was that these ghettos would protect the Jews from violence and looting, especially from the Jesuits and their disciples.

Ladislaus and his nobility had a troubled relationship with the Ukrainian Cossacks for which the Jews would end up paying for dearly.

==== Effect of the Cossacks' Uprising in Lithuania ====
The fury of this uprising destroyed the organization of the Lithuanian Jewish communities. The survivors who returned to their old homes in the latter half of the 17th century were practically destitute. The wars which raged constantly in the Lithuanian territory brought ruin to the entire country and deprived the Jews of the opportunity to earn more than a bare livelihood. The intensity of their struggle for existence left them no time to reestablish the conditions which had existed up to 1648. John Casimir (1648–1668) sought to ameliorate their condition by granting various concessions to the Jewish communities of Lithuania. Attempts to return to the old order in the communal organization were not wanting, as is evident from contemporary documents. Thus in 1672, Jewish elders from various towns and villages in the grand duchy of Lithuania secured a charter from King Michael Wiśniowiecki (1669–1673), decreeing "that on account of the increasing number of Jews guilty of offenses against the Shlyakhta and other Christians, which result in the enmity of the Christians toward the Jews, and because of the inability of the Jewish elders to punish such offenders, who are protected by the lords, the king permits the kahals to summon the criminals before the Jewish courts for punishment and exclusion from the community when necessary." The efforts to resurrect the old power of the kahals were not successful. The impoverished Jewish merchants, having no capital of their own, were compelled to borrow money from the nobility, from churches, congregations, monasteries, and various religious orders. Loans from the latter were usually for an unlimited period and were secured by mortgages on the real estate of the kahal. The kahals thus became hopelessly indebted to the clergy and the nobility.

A series of Takkanot were issued by the Lithunian Rabbis as Jewish refugees flooded into Lithuania. The Council of Lithuania introduced measures to protect the rights of local Jews and measures to protect domicile in towns.

==== The Deluge ====
In 1653 Sweden and Russia, sensing weakness invaded the Commonwealth. Vilnius was captured by the Russians in 1655, and Russians and Cossacks sacked for 17 days with Poles and Jews either being killed or fleeing the city. Many Jews from across Lithuania fled to Amsterdam where, according eyewitnesses the Jews of Amsterdam treated them kindly; others went to other cities such as Frankfurt and were also treated kindly by the Jewish communities of these other cities. The Polish liberated Lithuania in 1661, and at this point Jews began to return to the area with help from the king and the Jesuits, who also helped the Jews rebuild their communities.

By 1665, the Jews were under royal protection from physical and political assault but they had a powerful new enemy in the emerging middle class. The middle class, as owner of factories and shops, were in constant economic competition with Jews and as Christians, they had never accepted Jews as equals and were jealous of the Jews success. They expressed this disdain by organizing pogroms and spreading religious hatred against the Jews. The royal court was asked many times to restrict the rights of Jews and they usually obliged. Jewish trading days were reduced, Jews were banned from selling meat on Fridays and Ash Wednesday, Jews were banned from trading fish, Jews were banned from working as silversmiths, goldsmiths, tanners, and bristle manufacturers.

The war had devastated Lithuanian Jewry with mass death, rampant poverty, assimilation, and destruction being omnipresent. Over 400 Jewish communities had been destroyed, and many were made homeless. Local Jewish communities attempted to help the homeless but the burden was too high for them so the Council of Four Lands and Kahal of Lithuania assumed responsibility, going into debt to help the poor, sometimes borrowing from Catholic Clergy and Churches.

=== Shabtai Tzvi ===
It was at this time when letters from Israel, Thessaloniki, and İzmir began to arrive telling of a messiah who had arisen in Israel by the name of Shabtai Tzvi. News of this messiah spread quickly across the Jewish world from Yemen, to Lithuania, to Essequibo with many Jews being swept up in the excitement. They believed that Shabtai would lead them in a Gathering of Israel where they would return to the land of Israel. In preparation for this many businesses ad properties were sold and wealthy believers made arrangements to rent ships for the journey. Skeptics remained though, especially among the learned with many writings appearing viciously denouncing Shabtai.

The movement was shattered in 1666 went Shabtai Tzvi converted to Islam, and this led the majority of Sabbateans to revert to mainstream Judaism but a minority either followed Shabtai into Islam forming the Dönmeh who outwardly practiced Islam but were secretly Jewish, reverted to Judaism but secretly remained Sabbatean, or remained outwardly Sabbatean. The anti-Sabbateans persecuted and attacked them demanding a return to strict Orthodoxy.

Jewish crypto-Sabbateans continued to exist for over 100 years after Shabtai Tzvi's death. While public Sabbateanism in Lithuania was spread by Yehoshua Heshen ben Yosef. He joined the movement in 1666 and proclaimed Shabtai as the messiah, he led Sabbateans in Lithuania for 30 years before later moving the Kraków with a number of his followers. Other notable Sabbateans included Zodok of Grodno and possibly Judah Hasid though this is not known for sure.

=== Karaite Affairs ===
During this era relations between the Karaite and Rabbinic Jews were mixed, the Council of Lithuania taxed the Karaites alongside the Rabbinites which led the Karaites to successfully lobby King Wladislaw IV to expel all Rabbinic Jews from Troki. But the Karaites also frequently used Rabbinic Courts in order to benefit from their power and prestige, though in 1665 the Karaite leadership known as the Council of Three forbade this practice.

The Karaites were throughout this period treated as one in the same with the Jews, as they had been before the commonwealth. By 1576 they had made the same progress as the Jews, building a synagogue, a Talmud Torah, and even had their own police to keep watch over their own community. The divides between the Rabbinic and Karaite Jews were mostly theological. The Karaites governed themselves by the means of a General Assembly whose primary purpose was the elect the religious and secular leaders of the community, handle internal issues, and appoint functionaries This assembly initially met once ever year but later met irregularly.

The various Karaite communities were led by secular judges known as voits, initially elected by the General Assemblies later became a whose job was the maintain the communities autonomy and manage civil disputes while also being the official representative to the federal government. For payment the Voits were given a house, a plot of land, and a 10% commission of the legal cases argues before him. The appointment of a Voit had to be approved by the Voivode in whose land the town was located in. The Assemblies also elected three Dayamin or religious judges who served as the spiritual leaders with the power to issue herems.

=== Michał Korybut Wiśniowiecki (1669-1673) ===
The Commonwealth at this time was marked by instability and indecisiveness. There were frequent internal conflicts and civil wars which nearly brought the nation to its knees; with the Sejm of Warsaw repeatedly intervening to limit violence. The final blow was dealt by Grand Hetman George Lubomirski, launched a rebellion against John Casimir; with instability and personal frustration leading John Casimir to resign in 1668. The Sejm filled the vacant position with a compromise candidate, Michał Korybut Wiśniowiecki, with him being chosen due to his famous father Jeremi Wisniowieski, who had fought against the Cossacks during their rebellion under Bogdan Khmelnytsky. The Wisniowiecki had a good relation with the Jews owing to years long business partnerships. With the new king interviewing on the behalf of the Jews in their conflicts with the Trade Guilds and antisemitic rulings of canon law. Despite his best efforts, the country still reeled from years of war and conflicts between the central government, local governments, and the army and anti-Jewish sentiments continued to grow. With fanatical priests, especially Jesuits, being to primary spreaders of anti-Jewish ideas.

=== John III Sobieski (1674-1696) ===
John III Sobieski succeeded king Michael after his death in 1663. He was a renown military man though had to contend with internal chaos; the source of this chaos for most of his rule being the magnate class. He generally paid more attention to his Ruthenian lands and neglected the Grand Duchy of Lithuania. Despite his wife's fondness for the Catholic Church he was an enlightened monarch who was tolerant of all religions. In 1683 he suppressed riots against the Jews as well as an uprising and accompanying pogrom in Brest-Litovsk, which he followed up with actively prosecuting those involved. He also ordered the Sejm to contest the frequently made accusation of Blood Libel. Life for the Lithuanian Jews was becoming more complex. The power of the Kahals was beginning to collapse, especially after the rise of the Sabbateans when many Jews openly rebelled against the religious establishment. Converts to Christianity were awarded tax relief and other privileges but despite this there were few converts, mostly following pogroms. Though some exceptions such as the followers of the false messiah Jacob Frank and his daughter Eva exist.

During Sobieski's rule Vilnius became the center of Judaism in Lithuania, possibly due to the presence of the Lithuanian Supreme Court in the city. During this time period the Jewish communities maintained a large degree of autonomy with this being due to the mutually beneficial arrangement this autonomy created, as the Jewish autonomous system collected taxes on behalf of the government from the Jews but did not become a threat as the Jew had no greater political ambitions. Similar systems of autonomy existed for other minorities, the only difference was that the Jews lacked a national homeland. Sobieski was lenient on the Jews who could not pay their taxes with his renewing the 10-year moratorium first granted by John Casimir. We was a public opponent of the Blood Libel and pogroms, both of whom were so common that they overwhelmed the Kahals who were forced to turn to the state for help. Sobieski himself was personally close to the Jews with his physician being a Jew named Emanuel Ben-Yehuda and his customs farmer was a Jew named Bezalel.

=== Frederick Augustus II ===
The election of Frederick Augustus II was the first such election in which the Jews welded any electoral power. This was not due to Jewish suffrage of Jewish candidates, both of which were distant pipe-dreams at this time. But rather it was because the Jews were wealthier than they had been in the past and wished to that they were a powerful force; as such after studying each of many candidates position on the Jews as well as their general views they decided to support Frederick Augustus II.

Lithuanian Jewry, like the rest of the commonwealth, was engulfed in turmoil as the country collapsed. In 1712, although he confirmed the pre-existing Jewish rights and privileges the king signed a new decree accusing the Jews of the Blood Libel. With a series of Blood Libel prosecution following. When king Frederick increased the Jewish head tax to 60,000 shoks the Jews sent two delegates to plead against the decree and they obtained a moratorium and guarantees of protection and freedom of worship. Two other times Frederick gave the Jews a 10-year moratorium to help with their heavy tax burdens in exchange for a large sum of money. To add to their financial troubles the Jews were beset by several disastrous fires. In 1731, most of Slobodka and parts of Kaunas burned to the ground in 1734 man Jews were killed and the Jewish quarter was destroyed during the Great Fire of Vilnius. The Jews were given no relief due to these fires, with some of their enemies accusing them of starting the fires.

The during this time were under attack by the local governments, the burghers, the trade guilds, the gentry, and the church. They appealed to the Sejm and the King for help, but they usually responded to their appeals with indifference. The rules designed to protect them often contained loopholes or contradictions, and when someone stepped in to try and help the Jews the Christian majority often responded with riots. While the Royal Court which often mediated disputes between the local governments and the Jews generally ruled against the Jews, imposing fines on them. Though despite these difficulties the Jewish community continued to expand geographically and numerically.

=== Frederick Augustus III ===
The election of Frederick Augustus III was a time of foreign influence and national decline, with the king himself spending the vast majority of his time in Saxony. During his rule Ukrainian Haydamack launched a reign of terror which lasted from 1734-1736. Jews were the easiest targets of the Haydamack, with Orthodox propaganda only increasing their hatred. The Polish authorities were unable to defend the Polish population, let alone the Jews who were an unpopular minority. The Haydamack usually targeted easy targets such as Jewish tenant farmers, outlying Shtetls, and Jewish traveling merchants. With their attacks sometimes escalating into large scale massacres, in which women and children were often not spared. The revolt was finally defeated by a joint Russian-Polish effort. The Gentry had grown very powerful and destroyed respect for the higher government in Lithuania. Elected officials answerable to the Gentry gained control of individual towns, infringing on the magnates powers and damaging the Governance of these towns. They then used their new power to dominate the burghers, peasants, and Jews now under their control. Using their power to take control of the export of corn, potash, hemp, and cattle from the Jews and burghers. Eventually they surpassed the king in power and became the strongest force in the Commonwealth. Despite the kingdoms declared neutrality, foreign armies marched through the country in 1735 during the Russo-Turkish war and from 1740-1763 during the Austrian Wars of Succession. Young men were forcibly drafted into the Russian and Prussian armies and in 1742 Elizabeth of Russia's soldiers occupied part of the Commonwealth and expelled the Jewish population from the region.

As the economy constantly worsened, Christian Antisemitism increased significantly. Encouraged by the Antisemitic mayor of Kaunas who confined the cities Jews to a ghetto, and by extremist clergy, especially Jesuits, who the Councils paid an annual bribe to limit their attacks. Accusations of Blood Libel and witchcraft became so pervasive that the Council of Poland and Council of Lithuania sent an ambassador to the Holy See, who ordered the future Pope Clement XIV to investigate the accusations with him finding them to be false and recommending the Church takes efforts to protect the Jews. But this victory was cold comfort, the Jews were among those who suffered the most from Commonwealths degeneration. Catholic controlled municipalities such as Vilnius, Gardinas, and Novogrodek among many others incited hooligans to attack Jews and loot their homes in order to make up for the impossibly high tax burdens the Jews had placed on them. The government banned Jews from leasing the right to collect customs duties, in a process lasting from 1728-1730. But many Jews got around this by getting Christian business partners and as late 1756 there were complaints of Jews still engaging in this practice.

It became standard practice for Jews to supply their Voivode and his assistants with luxurious good such as furs, sugar, salt, and boots, and Spices. In addition they were expected to pay the wages of the Voivode's guards and servants plus funding his lavish way of life. Even when this practice was banned in 1745 municipal officers continued to have the Jewish communities shower them with gifts. From the years 1756-1759 this practice was accompanied to large scale looting of Jewish homes, synagogues, and businesses. Junior officers, due to their lack of law enforcement powers, were simply bribed.

The personal record of Frederick Augustus III on the Jews was mixed. On the positive side in 1738 he reconfirmed the Jewish Charters and privileges, but on the other hand in the same year he imposed a 1,500 zloty head-tax on all city dwellers. Nobody could afford this but the Jews were particularly affected because they already had the highest tax burden. Augustus III, like his father, gave the Jews a 10 year moratorium and absolved the Councils of interest payments on their late taxes. In disputes between the burghers and the local governments against the Jews he was largely ambivalent but when he did intervene he supported the local governments against the Jews. In 1761 a massive scandal erupted when it was discovered that the King and some of his allies had been engaging in a coin debasing scheme, when this was discovered European merchants refused to accept the coins causing a loss of several million zloty. The king and his treasurers pinned the blame of the Jewish owned company producing the coins, this resulting in antisemitic wave to cross over the Commonwealth which greatly harmed the Jewish community of the Commonwealth.

=== Stanislaw II Poniatowski ===
Stanislaw II Poniatowski was elected King of the Commonwealth at the behest of Prussia and the Russian Empire. In accordance with this foreign influence, in 1767 the Lesser Gentry recognized Catherine II as the protector or the Commonwealth and with the support of King Poniatowski and the Sejm lobbied for increased restrictions on the Jews and foreigners. The community successfully organized to fight these restrictions led by community leader Arieh Leib Meitess and supported by Vice Chancellor of Lithuania Joachim Chreptowitz. Further Antisemitic campaigns continued but the Royal Court ruled the Jews favor in these attacks. Jewish affairs were not a primary concern of the king, though he did improve their civil rights a fair deal. In 1784, Jews were finally allowed to engage in any profession they wished. With special Jewish taxes also being abolished, the Jews now lived as pretty much equal citizens to everyone else. From 1765 onward, all Jews irrespective of age of gender were forced to pay an annual poll tax of 2 zloty, however in the same decree Poniatowski renewed the Jews' privileges for another 20 years.

In 1772 seizing on the opportunity created by revolts and general instability, Prussia, Russia, and Austria signed a treaty which led to the First Partition of Poland; Ponatowski and the Sejm were made to accept these losses without resistance via military threats and bribery.

Under the effective leadership of Ignacy Potocki, the Commonwealth began to enact a series of desperately needed reforms. A new constitution was issued which abolished the Liberum Veto, equalized the number of Poles and Lithuanians in the Sejm, a long with a series of other reforms. This Great Sejm, which lasted from 1788-1792, elected a special deputation to review the laws governing the Jew's status, but the Sejm completely ignored the Jewish question. The Sejm did make several changes which affected the Jew's though: all religion were given freedom of conscience, municipalities were empowered, only Christians were allowed to be citizens, and a new constitution was issued. Many Jews were disenfranchised from other reforms with many who had worked a revenue collectors for the government switched or working a innkeepers or small business owners. In 1776 the Sejm deprived the towns of villages of the self government they had enjoyed under the old Magdeburg Rights. Meanwhile other reforms gave towns judicial and administrative autonomy, as well as representation in the Sejm. The Jews were unhappy with the municipal reform as they viewed the municipalities as hostile and preferred to be ruled by the voivode's. They attempted to appeal but to no avail.This period also saw major economic improvements in the Commonwealth with many news canals, roads, and highways being constructed. Jews were among the foremost pioneers in these new innovations particularly the use of waterways in the timber industry.

The municipal dispute went beyond concerns over antisemitism and also involved a long term conflict between the burghers and the Jews. When the Jews clashed with trade guilds or burghers there was often only enough business for one of the two to survive, as markets were limited, competition was fierce, and poverty was commonplace. The Christian burghers and guilds often exploited the widespread economic suffering of the Christian artisans to incite them against the Jews, by scapegoating the Jews for the artisans economic woes. By these methods the burghers were effectively able to advance themselves at the Jews interest.

== Jewish culture in Lithuania ==
The founding of the yeshivot in Lithuania was due to the Lithuanian-Polish Jews who studied in the west, and to the German Jews who migrated about that time to Lithuania and Poland. Very little is known of these early yeshivot. No mention is made of them or of prominent Lithuanian rabbis in Jewish writings until the 16th century. The first known rabbinical authority and head of a yeshivah was Isaac Bezaleel of Vladimir, Volhynia, who was already an old man when Solomon Luria went to Ostroh in the fourth decade of the 16th century. Another rabbinical authority, Kalman Haberkaster, rabbi of Ostrog and predecessor of Luria, died in 1559. Occasional references to the yeshivah of Brest are found in the writings of the contemporary rabbis Solomon Luria (died 1585), Moses Isserles (died 1572), and David Gans (died 1613), who speak of its activity. Of the yeshivot of Ostrog and Vladimir in Volhynia it is known that they were flourishing in the middle of the 16th century, and that their heads vied with one another in Talmudic scholarship. Mention is also made by Gans of the head of the Kremenetz yeshivah, Isaac Cohen (died 1573), of whom but little is known otherwise.

At the time of the Lublin Union, Solomon Luria was rabbi of Ostrog, and was regarded as one of the greatest Talmudic authorities in Poland and Lithuania. In 1568 King Sigismund ordered that the suits between Isaac Borodavka and Mendel Isakovich, who were partners in the farming of certain customs taxes in Lithuania, be carried for decision to Rabbi Solomon Luria and two auxiliary rabbis from Pinsk and Tiktin.

The far-reaching authority of the leading rabbis of Poland and Lithuania, and their wide knowledge of practical life, are apparent from numerous decisions cited in the responsa. In the Eitan ha-Ezrachi (Ostrog, 1796) of Abraham Rapoport (known also as Abraham Schrenzel; died 1650), Rabbi Meïr Sack is cited as follows: "I emphatically protest against the custom of our communal leaders of purchasing the freedom of Jewish criminals. Such a policy encourages crime among our people. I am especially troubled by the fact that, thanks to the clergy, such criminals may escape punishment by adopting Christianity. Mistaken piety impels our leaders to bribe the officials, in order to prevent such conversions. We should endeavor to deprive criminals of opportunities to escape justice." The same sentiment was expressed in the 16th century by Maharam Lublin (Responsa, § 138). Another instance, cited by Katz from the same responsa, likewise shows that Jewish criminals invoked the aid of priests against the authority of Jewish courts by promising to become converts to Christianity.

The decisions of the Polish-Lithuanian rabbis are frequently marked by breadth of view also, as is instanced by a decision of Joel Sirkes (Bayis Hadash, § 127) to the effect that Jews may employ in their religious services the melodies used in Christian churches, "since music is neither Jewish nor Christian, and is governed by universal laws."

Decisions by Luria, Meïr Katz, and Mordecai Jaffe show that the rabbis were acquainted with the Russian language and its philology. Jaffe, for instance, in a divorce case where the spelling of the woman's name as Lupka or Lubka was in question, decided that the word is correctly spelled with a "b," and not with a "p," since the origin of the name was the Russian verb lubit = "to love," and not lupit = "to beat" (Levush ha-Butz we-Argaman, § 129). Meïr Katz (Geburat Anashim, § 1) explains that the name of Brest-Litovsk is written in divorce cases "Brest" and not "Brisk," "because the majority of the Lithuanian Jews use the Russian language." It is not so with Brisk, in the district of Kujawa, the name of that town being always spelled "Brisk." Katz (a German) at the conclusion of his responsum expresses the hope that when Lithuania shall have become more enlightened, the people will speak one language only—German—and that also Brest-Litovsk will be written "Brisk". (Note: This section is copied from The Jewish Encyclopedia.)

=== Items from the Responsa ===
The responsa shed an interesting light also on the life of the Lithuanian Jews and on their relations to their Christian neighbors. Benjamin Aaron Solnik states in his Mas'at Binyamin (late 16th and early 17th century) that "the Christians borrow clothes and jewelry from the Jews when they go to church." Sirkes (l.c. § 79) relates that a Christian woman came to the rabbi and expressed her regret at having been unable to save the Jew Shlioma from drowning. A number of Christians had looked on indifferently while the drowning Jew was struggling in the water. They were upbraided and beaten severely by the priest, who appeared a few minutes later, for having failed to rescue the Jew.

Luria gives an account (Responsa, § 20) of a quarrel that occurred in a Lithuanian community concerning a cantor whom some of the members wished to dismiss. The synagogue was closed in order to prevent him from exercising his functions, and religious services were thus discontinued for several days. The matter was thereupon carried to the local lord, who ordered the reopening of the building, saying that the house of God might not be closed, and that the cantor's claims should be decided by the learned rabbis of Lithuania. Joseph Katz mentions (She'erit Yosef, § 70) a Jewish community which was forbidden by the local authorities to kill cattle and to sell meat—an occupation which provided a livelihood for a large portion of the Lithuanian Jews. For the period of a year following this prohibition the Jewish community was on several occasions assessed at the rate of three gulden per head of cattle in order to furnish funds with which to induce the officials to grant a hearing of the case. The Jews finally reached an agreement with the town magistrates under which they were to pay forty gulden annually for the right to slaughter cattle. According to Hillel ben Herz (Bet Hillel, Yoreh De'ah, § 157), Naphtali says the Jews of Vilnius had been compelled to uncover their heads when taking an oath in court, but later purchased from the tribunal the privilege to swear with covered head, a practice subsequently made unnecessary by a decision of one of their rabbis to the effect that an oath might be taken with uncovered head.

The responsa of Meïr Lublin show (§ 40) that the Lithuanian communities frequently aided the German and the Austrian Jews. On the expulsion of the Jews from Silesia, when the Jewish inhabitants of Silz had the privilege of remaining on condition that they would pay the sum of 2,000 gulden, the Lithuanian communities contributed one-fifth of the amount. (Note: This section is copied from The Jewish Encyclopedia.)

=== Vilna Gaon ===
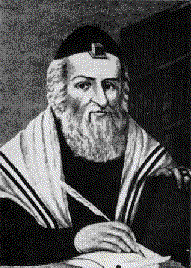
Rabbi Elijah ben Solomon, called the Vilna Gaon, is considered the greatest of all Litvish Jews

Religious observances owe greatly to Elijah ben Solomon (1720–1797), the Vilna Gaon, who lived in Lithuania's greatest city, Vilnius. His style of Torah and Talmud study shaped the analytical "Lithuanian-style" form of learning still practiced in most yeshivas. The yeshiva movement itself is a typical Lithuanian development, initiated by the Vilna Gaon's main disciple, Rabbi Chaim of Volozhin.

The Misnagdim were the early opponents of Hasidic Judaism, led by the Vilna Gaon who sharply denounced the innovations by the Hasidim. Despite this, several prominent Hasidic scholars and dynasties originated from Lithuania such as Karlin-Stolin founded by Aharon of Karlin, Kopust founded by Yehuda Leib Schneersohn and Koidanov. Some Polish Hasidic dynasties even settled in Lithuania such as those of Elijah Winograd.

== Lithuanian Jews under the Russian Empire ==
In 1795 the final Third Partition ended the existence of the Polish–Lithuanian Commonwealth, and the former lands of the Grand Duchy of Lithuania became part of the Russian partition.

Already in the 1860s, after central Lithuania was connected to the expanding European railroad network, a growing number of Jews began to leave, primarily to escape challenging economic conditions. Thanks to networks and the rise of steamships the migration increased after the 1870s. Antisemitic violence in the Lithuanian provinces was limited before 1900 and pogroms (which mostly occurred in the area of contemporary Ukraine) had no direct impact on Jewish migration from the northern Pale. Many Lithuanian and Polish Catholics also emigrated. Tens of thousands of Lithuanian Jews moved to the United States of America, Britain, and South Africa. A small number of committed Zionists emigrated to Palestine.

=== Karaite Separatism ===
In 1772 the Karaites sought an official divorce from the Jewish community, the Jewish Council of Lithuania which they belonged to was disbanded and the Karaites withdrew from the Kahals while also petitioning the government for separate legal status and autonomy. Before this the Karaites had considered themselves Jewish but by 1783 the Karaites of Lithuania had embarked on a separate path.

It was not until 1795 that this new situation was set in law, as the Russian Empire took control of Lithuania Catherine II signed legislation which legally differentiated the statuses of Rabbinic Jews and Karaites. Over time the groups grew increasingly different. In 1829 Karaites were exempted from military service while Jews weren't, in 1835 the Jews of Troki where expelled by the Russians at the request of the Karaites, in 1840 Karaites where given equal status to Muslims, and finally in 1863 they were given the same rights as Russians. This whole time Jews were severely discriminated against by the Russian Empire.

== Republic of Lithuania (1918–1940) ==
Historical Lithuanian Jewish population
Year	Pop.	±%
1389	6,000	—
1569	120,000	+1900.0%
1764	76,474	−36.3%
1792	250,000	+226.9%
1939	263,000	+5.2%
1959	24,683	−90.6%
1970	23,566	−4.5%
1979	14,703	−37.6%
1989	12,398	−15.7%
2001	4,007	−67.7%
2011	3,050	−23.9%
2021	2,256	−26.0%
Source: The Jewish population data includes Mountain Jews, Georgian Jews, Bukharan Jews (or Central Asian Jews), Krymchaks (all per the 1959 Soviet census), and Tats. It does not include Karaim, who as of 2021 numbered 192 individuals.

Lithuanian Jews took an active part in Freedom wars of Lithuania. On December 29, 1918, Lithuania's government called for volunteers to defend the Lithuanian state; of 10,000 volunteers, more than 500 were Jewish. More than 3,000 Jews served in the Lithuanian army between 1918 and 1923. Initially, the Jewish community was given a large amount of autonomy in education and taxation through community councils, or kehillot.

In 1923, all over Lithuania, inscriptions and signboards in non-Lithuanian languages were smeared with tar, and fascist groups posted renunciations on the walls of houses. Lithuanian Prime Minister Augustinas Voldemaras officially condemned these antisemitic acts by stating that "every Lithuanian, passing by these tarred signboards, must lower his eyes in shame".

By 1934, in a nationalist trend that was reflected throughout Europe, the government had scaled back much of this autonomy, and cases of antisemitism increased.

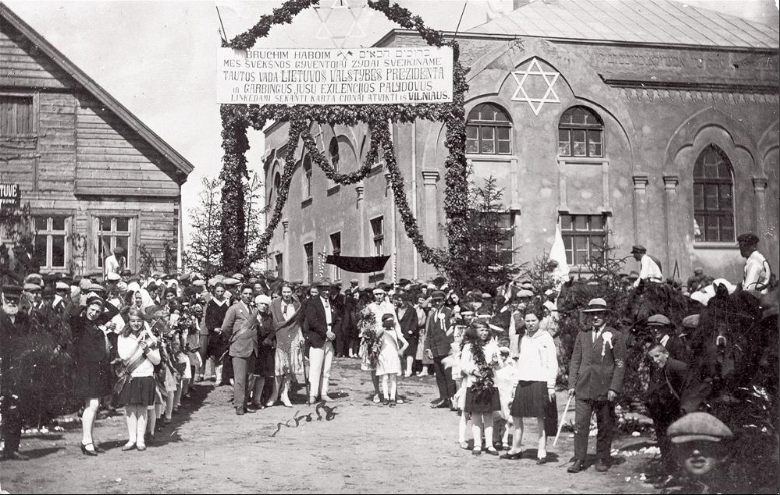
Lithuanian Jews in Švėkšna welcoming Lithuanian President Antanas Smetona and his companions under a Lithuanian and Hebrew languages banner and wishing to next time come from Vilnius (1928)

Lithuanian President Antanas Smetona was known for his tolerant stance towards Jews, and his radical opponents more than once nicknamed him the "Jewish King". Under Smetona's rule in Lithuania, no anti-Jewish laws were passed, and high-ranking Lithuanian officials, including ministers, did not publicly express anti-Jewish sentiments. Smetona considered Jews not as foreigners, but as Lithuanian citizens of foreign nationality. He acted against antisemitic acts with his statements, which were later followed by actions of governmental institutions (e.g., censorship). Those who participated in anti-Jewish physical attacks or smashed Jews’ windows were severely punished by the Lithuanian courts, war commandants, and the Lithuanian Police Force with fines or imprisonment, including hard labor prisons. Moreover, the Government of Lithuania did not tolerate anti-Jewish attacks and severely punished their participants, especially activists. Consequently, Jews wished Smetona a long rule of Lithuania.

Under Smetona's rule, Lithuania was anti-communist and did not tolerate insults against the German government while at the same time protected non-offending Jews. In 1934, the Ministry of National Defence of Lithuania adopted an order to counties commandants that stated to "severely punish all those who insult the German Government in any way, as well as those who deliberately agitate against Lithuanian Jews; to suppress the activity of all those Jewish organizations which appear to be under Communist cover or succumb to Communist influence". The 1938 Constitution of Lithuania (the last in the interwar period) did not change the situation of Lithuanian Jews, and it remained as such until the Soviet occupation of Lithuania in 1940.

After the Soviet occupation in June 1940, some Jewish communists assumed significant roles in the NKVD and local communist nomenklatura (e.g. Nachman Dushanski). Other Jews, particularly religious Jews and Zionists, were treated harshly by the Soviet-imposed communist government in Lithuania prior to the German invasion.

== World War II and the Holocaust ==
The Lithuanian Republic was occupied by Soviet Union in June 1940, and one year later, in June 1941, occupied by the Germans. During World War II, 91–95% of Lithuania's Jewish population were killed – almost all the Jews who had not managed to leave Lithuania and its environs. This was the highest casualty rate of Jews in any nation in the Holocaust. According to Yitzhak Arad, out of the 205,000 to 210,000 Lithuanian Jews who ended up under Nazi occupation, only between 9,000 and 10,000 of them survived; the remaining 196,000 to 200,000 were murdered by the Nazis in the Holocaust.

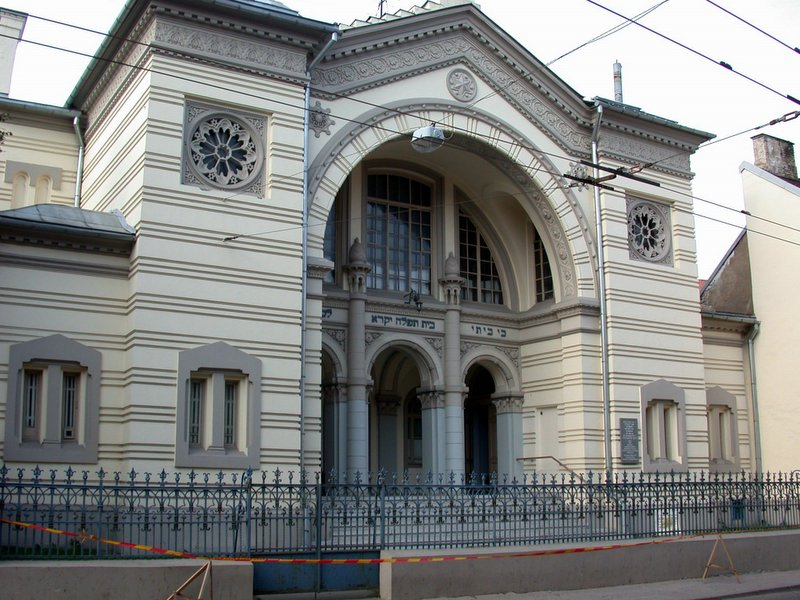
The Choral Synagogue of Vilnius, the only synagogue in the city to survive the Nazi holocaust and post-war Soviet oppression.

The only European yeshiva to survive the Holocaust was the Mir Yeshiva. With help of the Japanese consul in Kaunas, Chiune Sugihara, its leaders and students managed to escape to the Shanghai Ghetto.

== The Soviet era (1944–1990) ==
Following the expulsion of Nazi German forces in 1944, the Soviets reannexed Lithuania as a Soviet republic, and prosecuted a number of Lithuanians for collaborating with the Nazis. Sites of wartime massacres, such as the Ninth Fort near Kaunas became monuments. To avoid nationalist themes, the memorials were declared in the name of all victims, though the clear majority of them were Jewish. Most survivors never returned, moving to Israel instead. Throughout Soviet rule, there was tension between the Jewish community and the authorities over the right to emigrate to Israel, and how to properly commemorate the Holocaust. The majority of Jews in Soviet Lithuania arrived after the war, with Russian and Yiddish as their primary language.

Despite the lack of any intent to support the project, the Jewish community was allowed to open the Jewish Museum in 1944 which was located in the apartment of its first director, Shmerl Kaczerginski. The institution served as a community center which received hundreds of inquiries from all across the world about the fate of individual Jews in Lithuania. In 1945 the museum was relocated to the former ghetto library and jail buildings in Vilnius. The first exhibition at the museum was titled "The Brutal Destruction of the Jews during the German Occupation". In 1949, the Council of Ministers of the Lithuanian Soviet Socialist Republic de facto closed down the museum when it ordered its reorganized into the Vilnius Local History Museum. The Vilnius Jewish School was closed in 1946, and the one in Kaunas 1950. Jewish cemetery in Vilnius was paved over, the Old Vilnius Synagogue was razed while Jewish grave-stones were used to construct the stairs at the Tauras Hill, as well as those at the Evangelical Reformed Church. While institutionalized Jewish memory was abolished, a few memorials were allowed to continue with at least forty-five out of 231 Holocaust memorials in Lithuania being constructed before 1991. The death of Stalin brought some improvement in the status of Lithuanian Jews, with new Jewish communities moving to the country from less developed parts of the USSR and some development of the Holocaust narrative over the years. The book Mass Murders in Lithuania was published in 1965 and 1973 as the first publication directly addressing the topic of Holokaust. The Art of Lithuania's Jews exhibition was opened in Kaunas and Vilnius in 1988 as the first public display of Jewish culture anywhere in the Soviet Union. The Lithuanian Jewish Cultural Association was established in 1988 and it was renamed into the Lithuanian Jewish Community in 1991.

== Jews in modern Lithuania ==
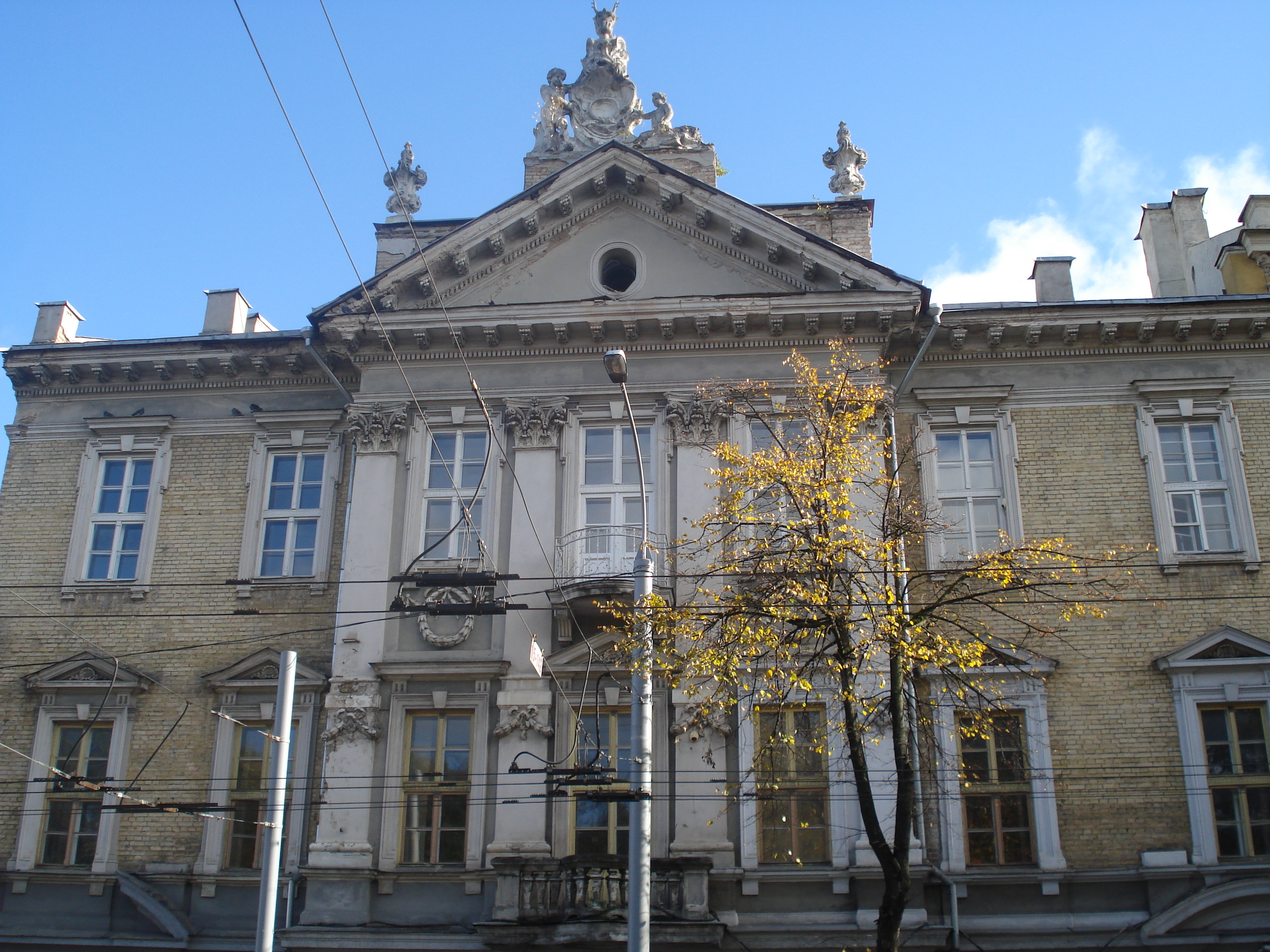
Vilna Gaon Jewish State Museum

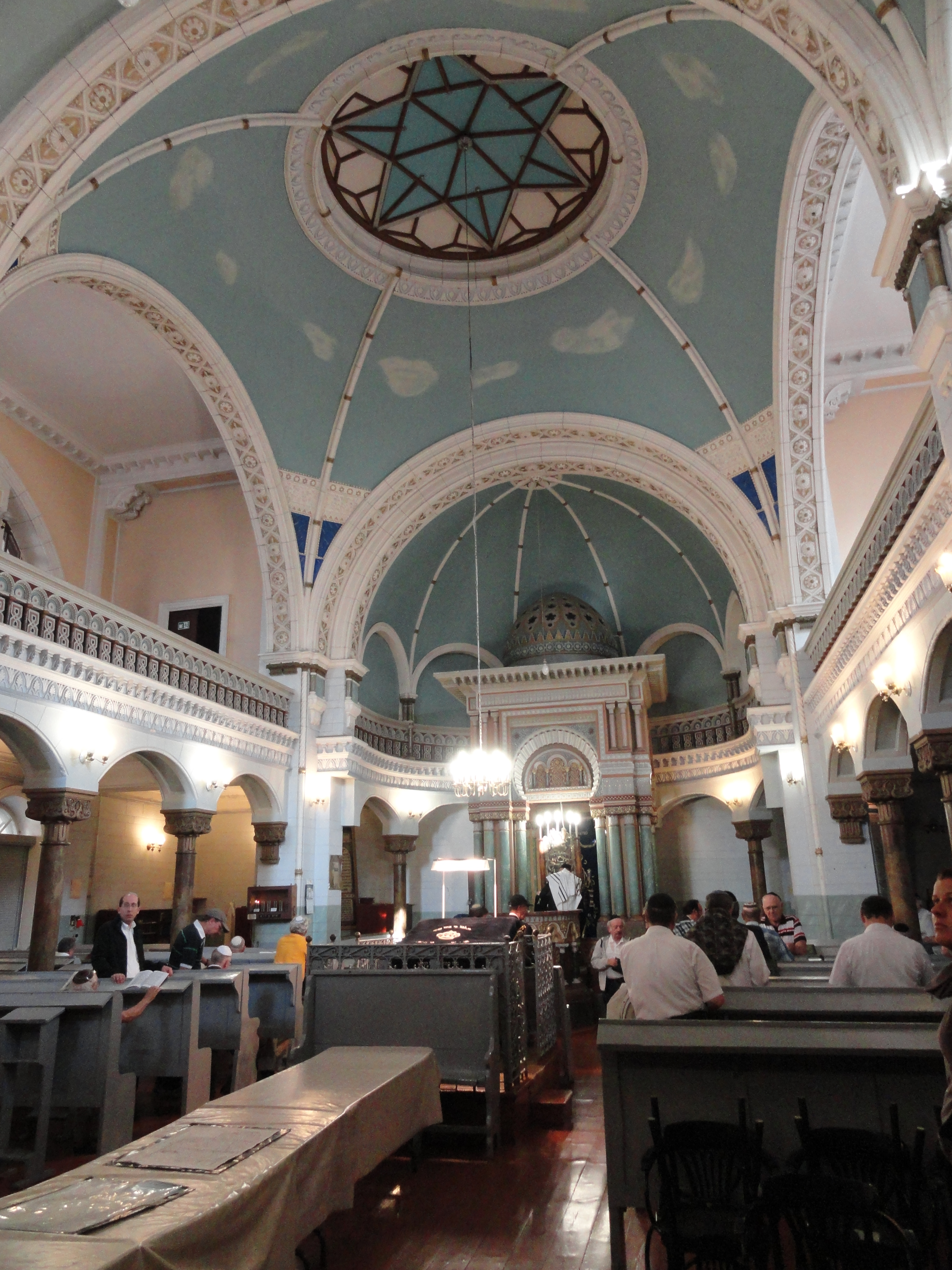
Interior of Synagogue of Vilnius

The Jewish population of Lithuania continues a slow decline. In the 2001 census, there were 4,007 Jews by ethnicity. This declined by 2011 to 3,050 and 2,256 by 2021. The Jews also had the oldest age profiles; 41% of Jews were in the 60+ age demographic and only 13.2% were under the age of 20. There were also 192 Karaims by ethnicity for a total of 2,448; this was a significant decrease from the number of 423 in 2011. Karaims have historically defined themselves as ethnically distinct from Jews in Lithuania. In both the 2001 and 2011 census, Jews were Lithuania's fifth biggest ethnic minority, behind Poles, Russians, Belarusians and Ukrainians, and just ahead of Germans.

Interest among descendants of Lithuanian Jews has spurred tourism and a renewal in research and preservation of the community's historic resources and possessions. Increasing numbers of Lithuanian Jews are interested in learning and practising the use of Yiddish. In 2000, the Jewish population of the country was 3,600.

The beginning of the 21st century was marked by conflicts between members of Chabad-Lubavitch and secular leaders. In 2005, Chief Rabbi Sholom Ber Krinsky was physically removed from the Synagogue by two men hired by the community's secular leader Mr. Alperovich, who then declared a new Chief Rabbi. For more detail, see Chabad-Lubavitch related controversies: Lithuania.

Public debate has ensued over memorials to Nazi collaborators. In 2019, a memorial plaque in central Vilnius was smashed with a sledgehammer by Jewish Lithuanian politician Stanislovas Tomas. Lithuanian authorities also removed several memorials of other collaborators. The removal of these memorials sparked antisemitic backlash, leading to threats against the Choral Synagogue, Vilnius's only remaining synagogue, along with the Jewish community headquarters, both of which were temporarily shuttered due to the threats.

In February 2024, the European Jewish Congress reported that security cameras caught an unknown perpetrator throwing a stone at the Litvak Jewish Community (LJC) center and breaking the glass, as well as stones being thrown into the homes of Jews in Šiauliai County.

== See also ==
- Timeline of Jewish history in Lithuania and Belarus
- History of Lithuania
- List of Lithuanian Jews
- Wooden synagogue
