= Children of Israel =

Children of Israel, or B'nai Israel, or Bani Isra'il, or other transliterations from Hebrew or Arabic, may refer to:

- Jews as a people, or Am Yisrael
- Israelites, an ancient Semitic-speaking people who emerged in Canaan during the Iron Age
  - Twelve Tribes of Israel, in the Hebrew Bible
- B'nai Israel, the name of several Jewish communities and synagogues
- Bani Israël, a village in Senegal
- Bani Israël (Bignona), another village in Senegal
- Banu Israil, a Muslim community of Jewish origin in Arabia
- Bene Israel, a historic community of Jews in India
- Ben-Israel or Ben-Yisrael, a Hebrew surname
- Beni Israel Cemetery, or B'nai Israel Cemetery, in Eudora, Kansas, United States
- Al-Isra', also known as Banī Isrāʾīl, the 17th chapter of the Quran
- Bukharan Jews, or Bnei Israel, a historic community of Israelites in Central Asia
- Isawa (sect), also known as the Bani Isra'ila, an Islamic sect in Nigeria
- Samaritans, or Benai Yisrael, an ethnoreligious group originating from the Hebrews and Israelites of the ancient Near East

== See also ==
- Israelite (disambiguation)
- Ben Yehuda (disambiguation)
- Bar Yehuda (disambiguation)
- Beit Yisrael, a neighborhood in central Jerusalem
- Beta Israel, or Ethiopian Jews
- Qubur Bani Isra'il ('Tombs of the Children of Israel'), in the West Bank
