= Bar Yehuda (disambiguation) =

Bar Yehuda is a Hebrew language surname

Bar Yehuda may also refer to:

- Bar Yehuda Airfield , Israel
- Road 752 or Bar-Yehuda Road
- Bar-Yehuda Bridge, Tel Aviv, Israel

== See also ==
- Ben Yehuda (disambiguation)
