= Israelyan =

Israelyan or Israyelyan (in Armenian Իսրայելյան) is an Armenian surname derived from the word Israel. The Western Armenian variant is Israelian (Իսրայէլեան).

It may refer to:

== Israelian ==
- Garik Israelian (born 1963), Armenian-Spanish astrophysicist and scientist
- Vardan Israelian (born 1966), Armenian footballer and Ukrainian football functionary and club president

== Israelyan ==
- Karen Israelyan (born 1992), Armenian footballer

== Israyelian ==
- Rafayel Israyelian or Rafael Israelyan (1908–1973), Armenian architect

== See also ==
- Israeli (disambiguation)
- Israel Ori (1658–1711), an Armenian prominent figure of the Armenian national liberation movement and a diplomat that sought the liberation of Armenia from Persia and the Ottoman Empire
