= Ladder of Tyre =

Geographical feature of Lebanon and the Phoenician Coast

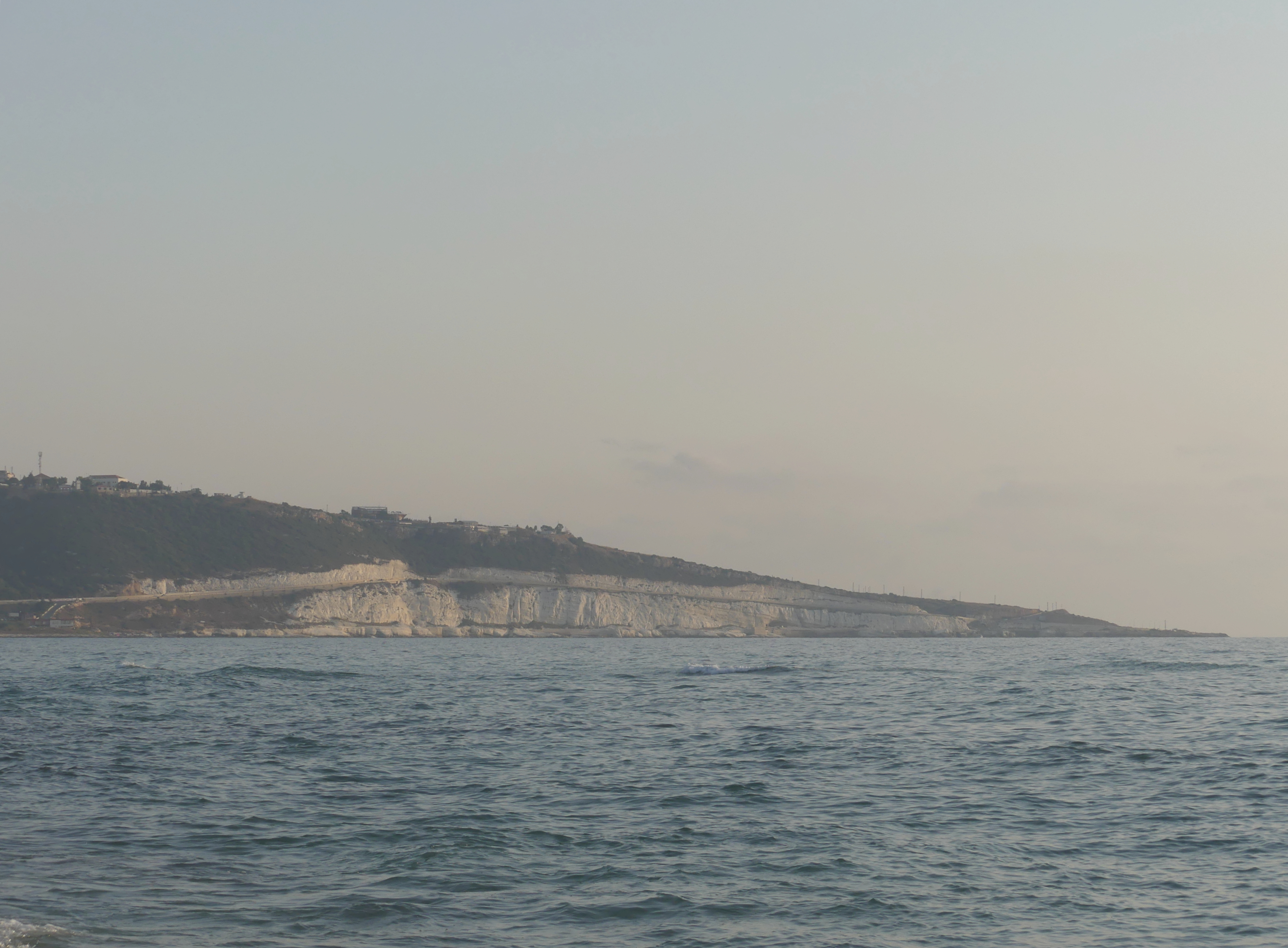
- Cape Blanco, or Ras-el-Abiad, seen from Mansouri beach in 2019.

Highest point
- Coordinates: 33°5′34.21″N 35°6′15.869″E

Geography
- Location within Lebanon

Ladder of Tyre (Aramaic: Sûlama de Ṣôr, Greek: Ἡ κλίμαξ Τύρου, Latin: Scala Tyriorum), also known as the Ladder of the Tyrians and the Promontory of Tyre, is a geographical feature mentioned in Greek and Hebrew sources, distinguished by a littoral mountainous range, the highest point of which is distant 18.5 kilometres (11.5 mi) north of Acre in northern Israel. The range stretches beyond Tyre in southern Lebanon. Along its Mediterranean coastline, the Ladder of Tyre skirts an area of about five miles wide at its greatest width, and is distinguished by capes that jut westward into the sea from the ridge which runs parallel to the general line of the coast. These capes project more than a mile into the sea, and rise precipitously at a mean elevation of 250 feet (76 m) above sea level. The Ladder of Tyre is mentioned in the First Book of Maccabees (11:59), the writings of Josephus, the Babylonian Talmud, and the Jerusalem Talmud.

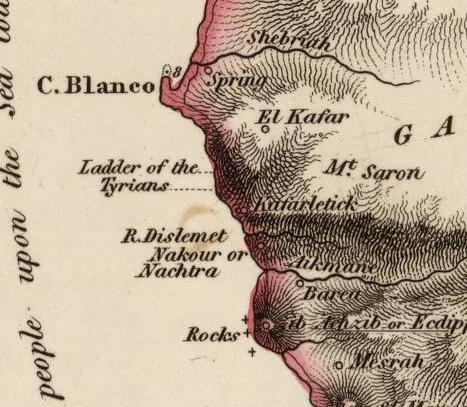
The Ladder of Tyre, shown in Aaron Arrowmsmith's 1815 map A Sketch of the Countries between Jerusalem and Aleppo

According to the Babylonian Talmud, the waters of the region were formerly known for the marine mollusk Murex, harvested for its blue-dye. The 1st-century historian Josephus puts 100 stadia (c. 11½ mi.; 18½ km) from the north of Acre to the highest point in the promontory known as the Ladder of Tyre. This high place is now associated with the Rosh HaNikra grottoes, which marked the southern pass into Phoenicia proper, and formed the boundary between that country and the kingdom of Israel. According to Josephus, a place nearby was also known for its fine, crystalline sand used in glass making.

Adolf Neubauer and Henry Baker Tristram thought that the Ladder of Tyre was to be identified with Cape Blanco (Ras el-Abyad, 'White Cape'), about 9.6 kilometres (6.0 mi) north of Rās en-Nakūrah (the Arabic name of Rosh HaNikra; see above) and belonging to the same mountain range. According to historical geographer Joseph Schwarz, where the Mount Amana range terminates at the rock cliffs of Rās en-Nakūrah, "on this rock is a narrow ascent, shaped somewhat like steps, by which its summit can be reached; hence it is called in the Talmud the Ladder of Tyre." Conder was of the same opinion, that the promontory of Nakūrah was the same as the ancient Ladder of Tyre. Historical geographer, Isaac Goldhor, places the Ladder of Tyre at a distance of 3 biblical miles from Achziv.

== Gallery ==
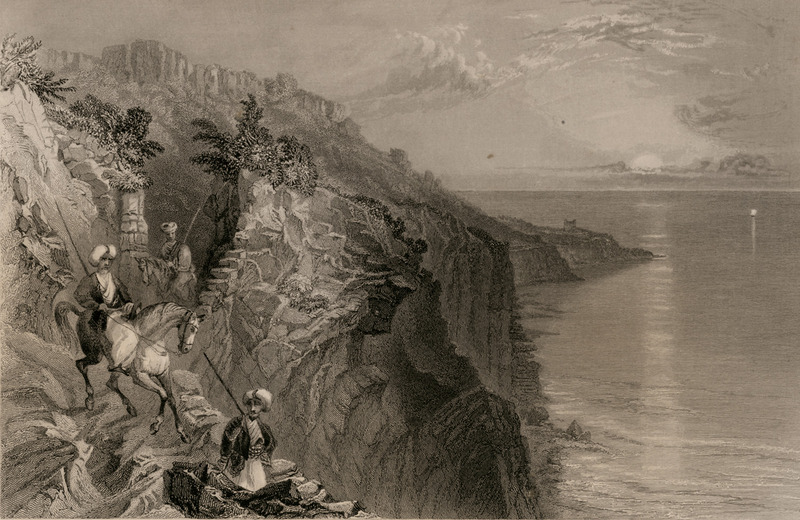
1836

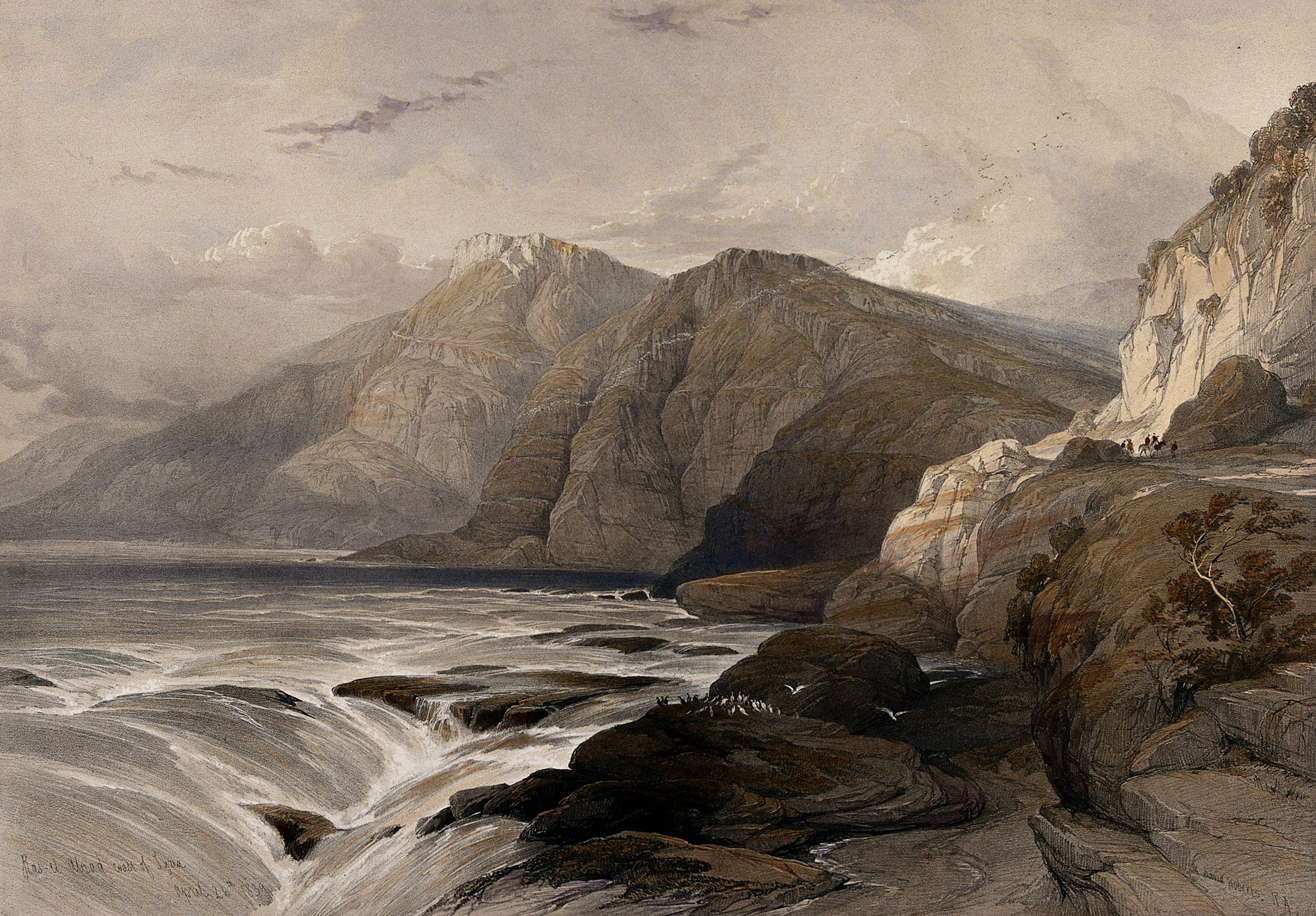
1839

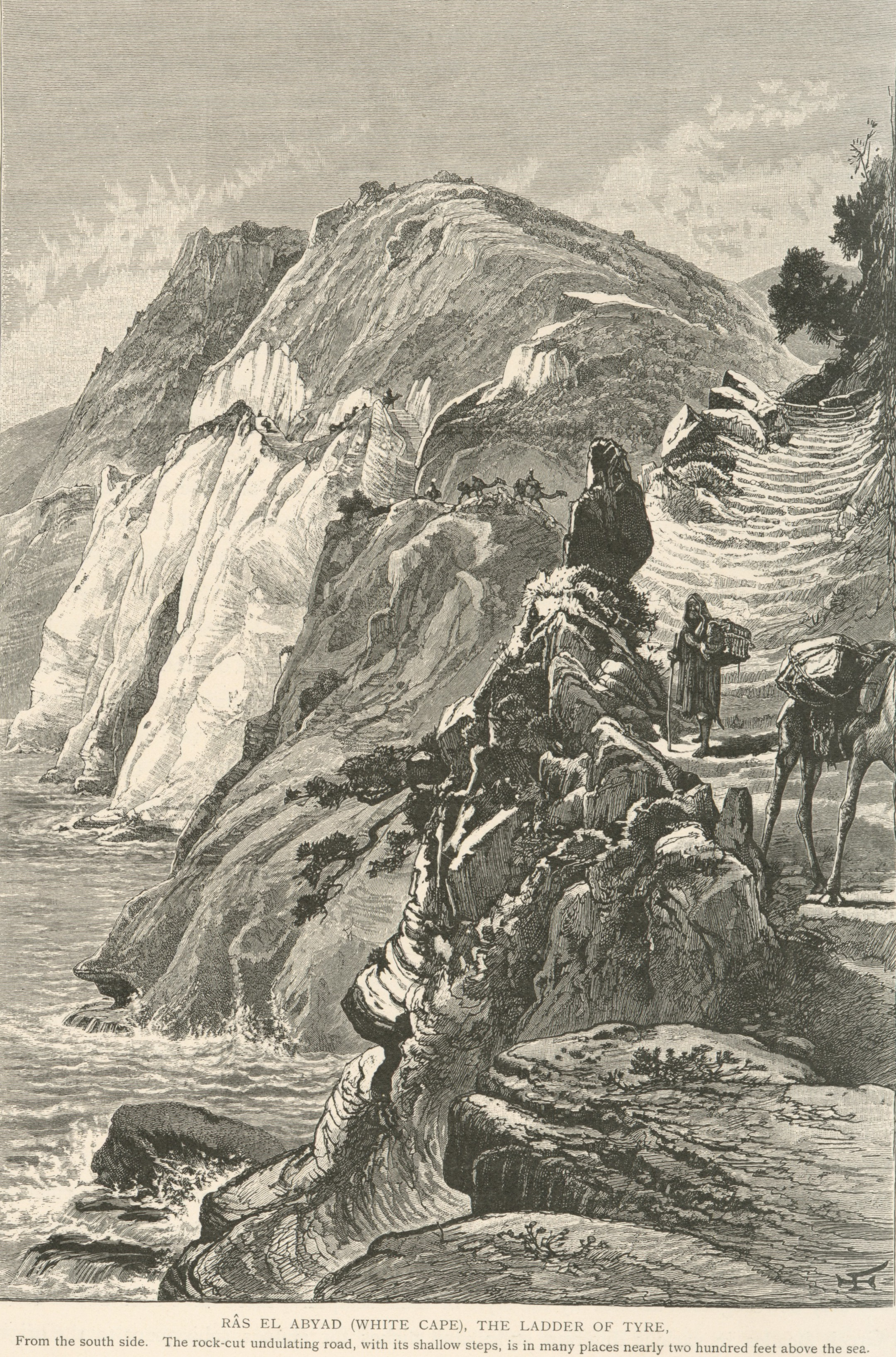
1881

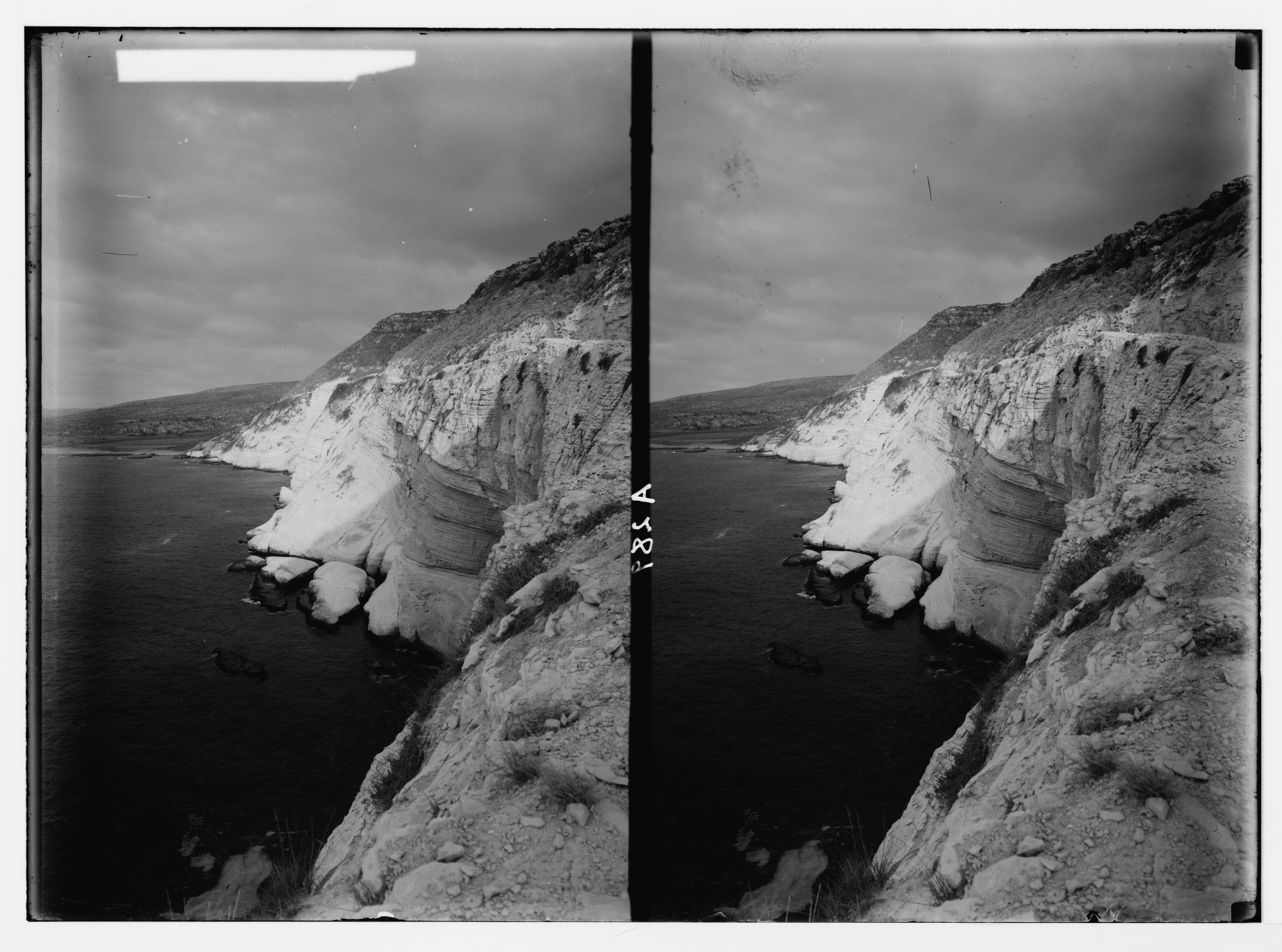
1900

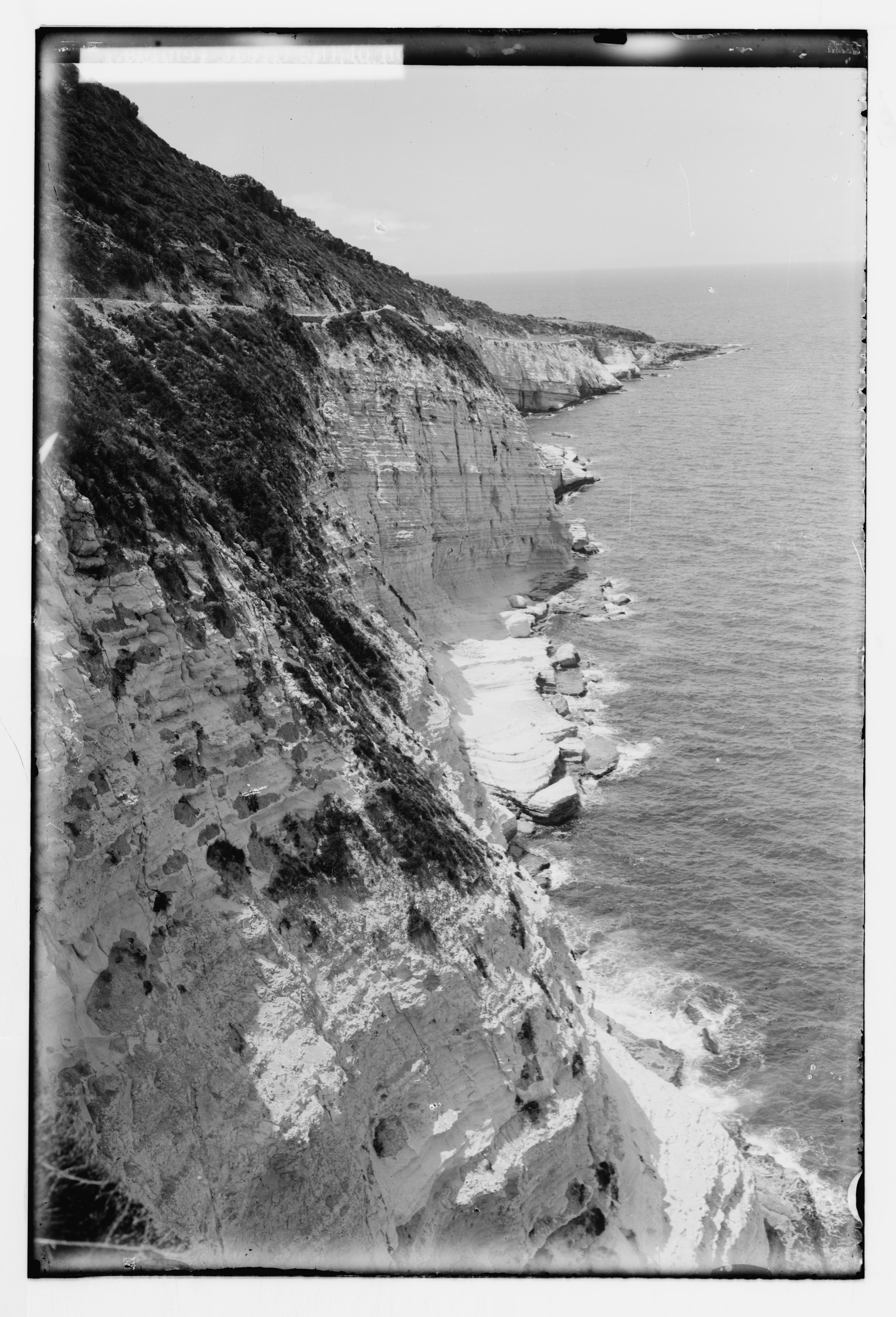
1900

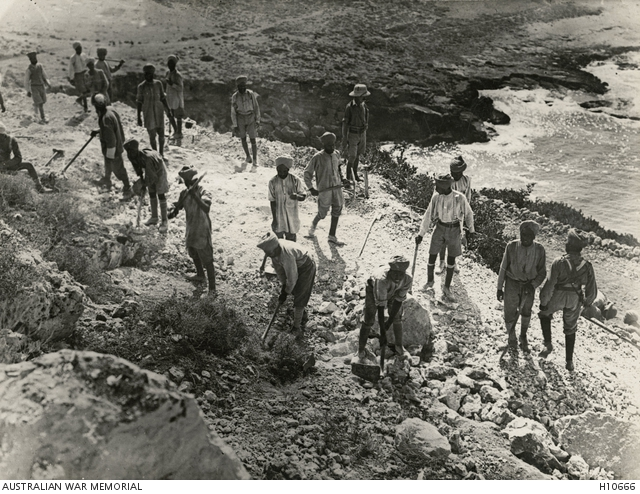
1918

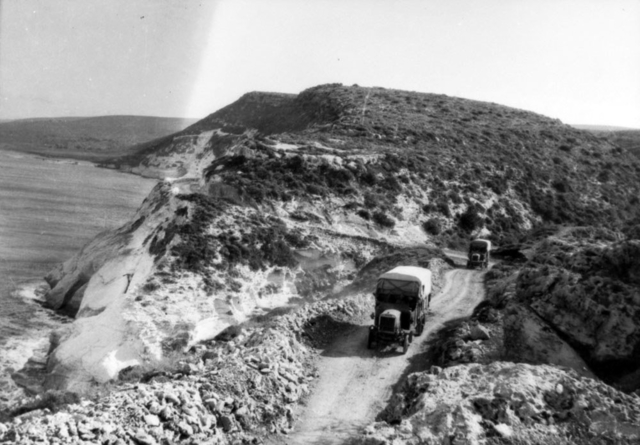
1918

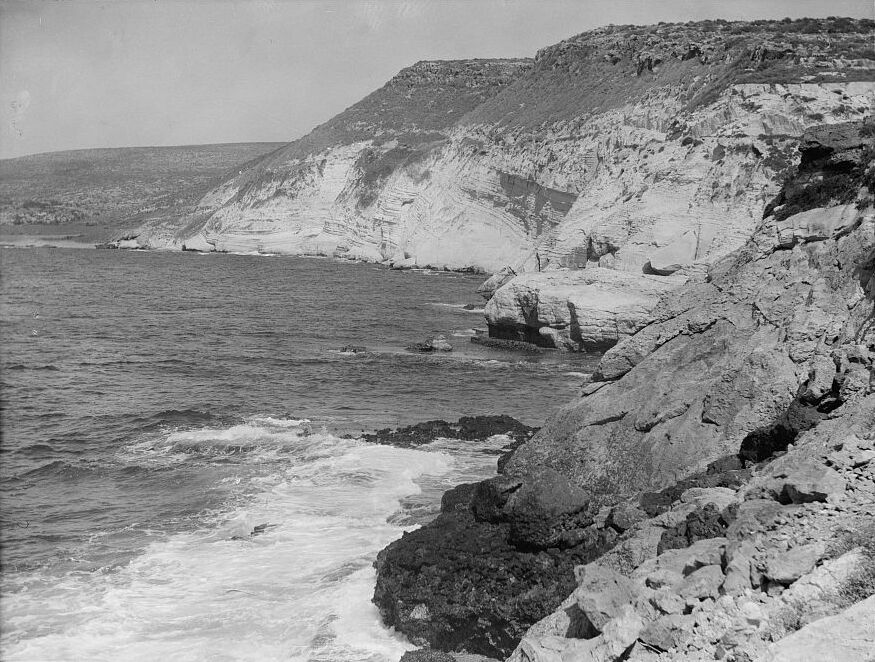
1920

== Bibliography ==
- Conder, C.R. (1878). Tent Work in Palestine. A Record of Discovery and Adventure. Vol. 1. London: Richard Bentley & Son (published for the Committee of the PEF). OCLC 23589738.
- Conder, C.R.; Kitchener, H.H. (1881). The Survey of Western Palestine: Memoirs of the Topography, Orography, Hydrography, and Archaeology. Vol. 1. London: Committee of the Palestine Exploration Fund.
- Goldhor, Isaac [in Hebrew] (1913). Adamat Kodesh, being the Land of Israel (in Hebrew). Vol. 2. Jerusalem: Yiddish Literature. OCLC 233044063.
- Guérin, V. (1880). Description Géographique Historique et Archéologique de la Palestine (in French). Vol. 3: Galilee, pt. 2. Paris: L'Imprimerie Nationale.
- Jensen, Lloyd B. (1963). "Royal Purple of Tyre". Journal of Near Eastern Studies. 22 (2). Chicago: The University of Chicago Press: 104–118. doi:10.1086/371717. JSTOR 543305. S2CID 161424526.
- Josephus. De Bello Judaico (Wars of the Jews). Perseus Books Group.
- Kitto, J. (1865). A Cyclopedia of Biblical Literature. Vol. 2 (3rd edition). Philadelphia: J.B. Lippincott and Co.
- Neubauer, A. (1868). La géographie du Talmud : mémoire couronné par l'Académie des inscriptions et belles-lettres (in French). Paris: Lévy. OCLC 474727878.
- Rodgers, Zuleika; Daly-Denton, Margaret; Fitzpatrick-McKinley, Anne, eds. (2009). A Wandering Galilean: Essays in Honour of Seán Freyne. Leiden: Brill. ISBN 9789004173552. OCLC 297406369.
- Safrai, S.; Flusser, D. (1976). The Jewish People in the First Century (Historical Geography, Political History). Vol. 2. Amsterdam: Van Gorcum, Assen.ISBN 90-232-1436-6
- Schwarz, Joseph [in Hebrew] (1969). A Descriptive Geography and Brief Historical Sketch of Palestine. Translated by Isaac Leeser. New York: Hermon Press. OCLC 255586852. (reprinted A. Hart: Philadelphia 1850)
- Tristram, H.B. (1865). Land of Israel, A Journal of travel in Palestine, undertaken with special reference to its physical character. London: Society for Promoting Christian Knowledge.
