= Ben Yehuda =

Ben Yehuda or Ben-Yehuda is a Hebrew-language surname or patronymic literally meaning "son of Yehuda". Notable people with this surname include:

- Eliezer Ben-Yehuda, (1858–1922), Jewish Litvak lexicographer of Hebrew and newspaper editor
- Hemda Ben-Yehuda (1873–1951), Jewish journalist and author, and wife of Eliezer Ben-Yehuda
- Nachman Ben-Yehuda, professor and former dean of the department of sociology and anthropology at the Hebrew University of Jerusalem
- Nadav Ben Yehuda (born 1988), Israeli mountain climber, search and rescue professional, photographer, and speaker
- Netiva Ben-Yehuda (1928–2011), Israeli author, editor, media personality, and commander in the pre-state Jewish underground, Palmach.
- Ralli Ben-Yehuda (born 1934), Israeli Olympic gymnast
- Yechezkel Landau or Yechezkel ben Yehuda HaLevi Landau (1713–1793), an influential authority in halakha (Jewish law)

== See also ==
- Children of Israel (disambiguation)
- Bar Yehuda
- Ben-Israel
