= Semitic religions =

The term Semitic religions most commonly refers to religions that were founded in Western Asia, such as pre-Abrahamic polytheisms and the Abrahamic religions like Judaism, Christianity, Islam, and Mandaeism.

- Ancient Semitic religion, polytheistic pre-Abrahamic religions practiced by Ancient Semitic peoples
- Semitic neopaganism, religions based on or attempting to reconstruct ancient Semitic religions
- Abrahamic religions, monotheistic

== See also ==
- Shem
- Semitic (disambiguation)
