= Hebrew Israelites =

Hebrew Israelites may refer to:

- the ancient Israelites, considered as a subgroup, ancestors of or identical with the Hebrews
- the modern Black Hebrew Israelites, groups of African Americans and others who believe they are descendants of the ancient Israelites

== See also ==
- Hebrew (disambiguation)
- Israelite (disambiguation)
