= Twelve Tribes (disambiguation) =

The Twelve Tribes of Israel were the traditional kin groups among the ancient Israelites.

Twelve Tribes may also refer to:

- Twelve Tribes of Ishmael, descendants of Ishmael from Book of Genesis
- Twelve noble tribes of Croatia, a late medieval nobility institution
- Twelve Circassian tribes, an historical self-division of the Circassian people
- Twelve Tribes of Israel (Rastafari), a Rastafari group formed in 1968
- Twelve Tribes communities, a Christian movement started in 1972

== Other ==
- Twelve Tribes (album), an album by Richard Souther
- Twelve Tribes (band), an American metalcore band

== See also ==
- Twelve Colonies, fictional human "tribes" in Battlestar Galactica television series
- Israelite (disambiguation)
- Kingdom of Israel (disambiguation)
