= Ivry =

Ivry and Ivri may refer to:

== People ==
- Ivrim (plural of Ivri), Hebrew for "Hebrews"
- Ivri Lider (born 1974), Israeli pop star
- Amit Ivry (born 1989), Israeli Olympic swimmer and national record holder
- David Ivry (born 1934), Israeli politician

== Places ==
- Ivry-sur-Seine, in the Val-de-Marne département
  - Ivry-sur-Seine (Paris RER), a station in Paris' express suburban rail system
- Ivry-le-Temple, in the Oise département
- Ivry-en-Montagne, in the Côte-d'Or département in eastern France
- Ivry-la-Bataille, in the Eure département in the Haute-Normandie region in northern France
- Ivry-sur-le-Lac, in the Laurentians, north of Montreal, Canada

== Other ==
- Indian Veterinary Research Institute (IVRI), Indian research facility in the field of the field of veterinary medicine.
- Mishpat Ivri, "Hebrew law" or "Jewish/Hebrew jurisprudence."
- Ivry (poem), by Thomas Babington Macaulay

== See also ==
- Hebrew (disambiguation)
