= Izrael =

Izrael is the spelling of Israel in several European languages.

Izrael may also refer to:

== Given name ==
- Izrael Abraham Staffel (1814–1884), Polish inventor
- Izrael Chaim Wilner (1917–1943), Polish-Jewish resistance fighter during World War II
- Izrael Hieger (1901–1986), Polish-born British biochemist
- Izrael Kanal, Jewish World War II resistance soldier in the Warsaw Ghetto
- Izrael Kohn (1885–1941), the last rabbi of the Koprivnica Synagogue
- Izrael Milejkowski (1887–1943), Polish physician and civic activist
- Izrael Poznański (1833–1900), Polish industrialist
- Izrael Scher (1901–1941), rabbi of the Vukovar Synagogue

== Surname ==
- Eva Grlić (née Izrael; 1920–2008), Croatian journalist and writer
- Yuri Izrael (1930–2014), Russian environmental scientist

== Music ==
- Izrael (band), a Polish reggae band

== See also ==
- Azrael (disambiguation), the angel of death in Islam and some traditions of Judaism
- Israel (disambiguation)
- See Israel (name) for other spellings: Yisrael, Yisroel
