= Jezreel =

Jezreel (Hebrew: יִזְרְעֶאֵל, Yizre'el, lit. God will sow) may refer to the following places and topics:

- Jezreel (city), an ancient Israelite city
- Jezreel Valley, a valley in northern Israel
- Jezreel Valley railway, railway in northern Israel
- Jezreel Valley Regional Council, regional council in northern Israel
- Yizre'el, a kibbutz in northern Israel

== See also ==
- Israel (disambiguation)
