= Ben Yehuda (disambiguation) =

Ben Yehuda or Ben-Yehuda is a Hebrew surname.

Ben Yehuda may also refer to:

- Ben Yehuda Street (Jerusalem), a major street in downtown Jerusalem
- Ben Yehuda Street (Tel Aviv), a street in Tel Aviv, Israel

== See also ==
- Children of Israel (disambiguation)
- Bar Yehuda
- Ben-Israel
