= Semitism =

Semitism or Semiticism may refer to:

- Semitism (linguistics), a grammatical or syntactical behaviour in a language which reveals that the influence of a Semitic language is present
- Judaism
- Philosemitism
- Semitic people

== See also ==
- Antisemitism
- Anti-Arab racism
- Semitic (disambiguation)
