= Meshullam Phoebus ben Israel Samuel =

Polish rabbi

Personal life
- Born: c. 1547
- Died: October 17, 1617

Religious life
- Religion: Judaism

Meshullam Phoebus ben Israel Samuel (Hebrew: משולם פייבש בן ישראל שמואל; c. 1547 – October 17, 1617) was a Polish rabbi, who served as av beit din of Kraków.

== Biography ==
Meshullam Phoebus ben Israel Samuel was born around 1547. He initially gained recognition as the head of a thriving yeshiva in Brest-Litovsk, one of his pupils being Joel Sirkes. In 1590 he introduced regulations aimed at upholding Sabbath observance. While the exact year of his relocation to Kraków is not documented, records confirm his presence there in 1605.

Meshullam was widely respected as an authority on rabbinical matters, he participated in the meetings of the Council of Four Lands while in Cracow, and was consulted by other prominent scholars of his time. Notable among these correspondences are his responses to inquiries from Meir Lublin and Sirkes. In a responsum to Joshua Falk ha-Kohen, Meshullam offered an interpretation of a passage from Niddah, demonstrating a thorough understanding of anatomy and some knowledge of Latin. Two additional responsa authored by Meshullam have been preserved.

Abraham Schrenzel, in his work Etan ha-Ezraḥi, references a treatise titled Sefer Shemot Giṭṭin by Meshullam on proper names in bills of divorce. Meshullam also edited and published the responsa of Moses Minz (Kraków, 1617).
