= Israelite (disambiguation) =

Israelites is a general term for ancient Hebrew people that inhabited Canaan during the Iron Age.

Israelite or Israelites may refer to:

== History ==
- The inhabitants specifically of the Kingdom of Israel (Samaria), later known as Samaritans

== Places ==
- Israelite Bay, a bay in Western Australia
- Israelite highland settlement, ancient Israelite settlement in the highlands north of Jerusalem discovered in archaeological field surveys conducted in Israel since the 1970s
- Israelite Tower, an archaeological site in Jerusalem's Jewish Quarter

== People ==
- David Israelite, American music executive
- Dean Israelite (born 1984), South African film director, writer, and producer

== Media ==
- The Israelite, presently The American Israelite, published weekly in Cincinnati, Ohio, the oldest Jewish newspaper in the United States

== Other uses ==
- "Israelites" (song), a 1969 song by Desmond Dekker & The Aces
- Israʼiliyyat, the body of narratives originating from Jewish and Christian traditions
- Messianic Israelite, a term coined to address members of the Assemblies of Yahweh
- Alliance Israélite Universelle, Paris-based international Jewish organization
- Black Hebrew Israelites (also called Hebrew Israelites, Black Hebrews, Black Israelites, and African Hebrew Israelites), groups of African Americans who believe that they are the descendants of the ancient Israelites
- Israelite Church of God in Jesus Christ, an organization of Black Hebrew Israelites

== See also ==
- Israeli (disambiguation)
- Israel (disambiguation)
- Hebrew Israelites (disambiguation)
- Children of Israel (disambiguation)
- Twelve Tribes (disambiguation)
- Jew (disambiguation)
