= Israel (Al Be Back and Kanye West song) =

2023 song by Al Be Back and Kanye West

Song by Al Be Back and Kanye West

from the album Dying Near a Charger
- Released: September 10, 2023
- Recorded: 2023
- Genre: Hip-hop
- Length: 3:05
- Songwriters: Albert Daniels; Kanye West

"Israel" is a song by American rappers Al Be Back and Kanye West from the former's album, Dying Near a Charger (2023). Written by both artists, its release followed previews that generated media attention due to the song's title and West's lyrics, which both Israeli and American media publications interpreted in light of West's prior controversies for antisemitic statements.

== Background and promotion ==
West and Al Be Back maintained a lengthy professional relationship, with Back being featured on West's song "Good Night" from his third studio album, Graduation (2007). In 2022, West made several antisemitic statements which received widespread controversy. However, by March 2023, West claimed that he was no longer antisemitic after watching Jonah Hill in 21 Jump Street.

In September 2023, Back previewed "Israel" on Instagram Live where he energetically reacted to it, rapping along to West's verse while jumping up and down. The preview acted as a glimpse of Back's album, Dying Near a Charger, which he also described on Instagram with a quote regarding death and technology. "Israel" was released on September 10, 2023, as the fifth track from Back's album Dying Near a Charger, which also features West on the song "Concussion" alongside American rapper Fivio Foreign.

== Lyrics and theme ==
In "Israel", West describes a personal encounter with the devil, rapping, "Y’all be talking about the devil, I seen a close-up." West further advocates for the freedom of Larry Hoover, recounts his life experiences after controversy, and references the Hebrew prophet Moses. Throughout the track, the word Israel is sung phonetically as Isreal and the phrases "is real" and "is it real". The alternative pronunciation is emphasized in the line "Tell me right now, is it real?", which is a pun on the words's parallels. According to Daneil Edelson of Ynet, it is unclear if the track praises or criticizes Israel.

== Critical reception ==
"Israel" received scrutiny from various media outlets. The Times of Israel deemed the track a "bad rap," criticizing it in relation to West's previous antisemitic remarks. Caroline Fisher of HotNewHipHop claimed that the song's mention of the devil "is sure to stir up some controversy." Similarly, Israel Hayom stated that the song is seemingly intended to create another antisemitic controversy.
