= Bani Israël (Bignona) =

- Village
- Location in Senegal
- Coordinates: 13.0708°N 16.558°W
- Country: Senegal
- Region: Ziguinchor
- Department: Bignona
- Arrondissement: Kataba
- Commune: Kataba I

Population (2002)
  - Total: 74
- Time zone: UTC+0 (GMT)

Bani Israël is a village in the rural commune of Kataba I, in the Bignona Department of the Ziguinchor Region of southwestern Senegal. In 2002 it had a population of 74.
