= Israeli =

Israeli may refer to:

- Something of, from, or related to Israel
- Israelis, citizens or permanent residents of the State of Israel
- Modern Hebrew, a language
- Israeli (newspaper), published from 2006 to 2008
- Guni Israeli (born 1984), Israeli basketball player

== See also ==
- Israel (disambiguation)
- Israelites (disambiguation), the ancient people of the Land of Israel
- List of Israelis
