= Slobodka-Ivanovka =

Village in Kursk Oblast, Russia

Slobodka-Ivanovka Слободка-Ивановка
- Village
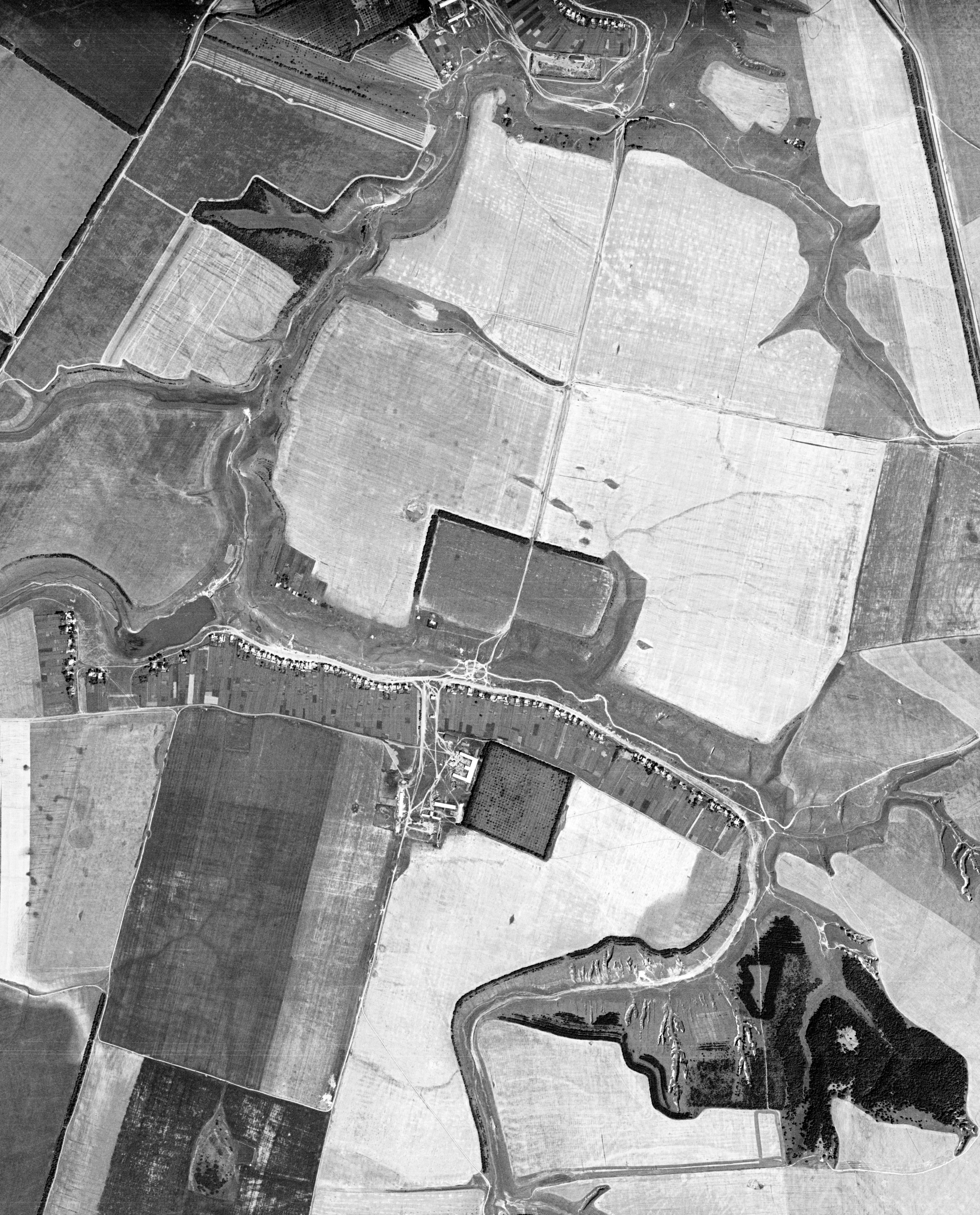
- Satellite imagery of the village of Slobodka-Ivanovka in 1972.
- Interactive map of Slobodka-Ivanovka
- Location of Slobodka-Ivanovka Slobodka-Ivanovka (European Russia) Slobodka-Ivanovka (Russia)
- Coordinates: 51°32′18″N 34°19′55″E
- Country: Russia
- Federal subject: Kursk Oblast
- Administrative district: Rylsky District
- Selsoviet: Slobodka-Ivanovka

Population (2010 Census)
  - Total: 58
  - Estimate (2010): 58 (0%)
- Time zone: UTC+3 (MSK)
- Postal code: 307361
- Dialing code: +7 47152
- OKTMO ID: 38634492111

Slobodka-Ivanovka is a village in the Rylsky District of Kursk Oblast. It is part of the Studenok Village Council. The population of the village as of 2010 was 58 people, which was down from 98 people in 2002.

== Geography ==
The village is located near the source of the Studenok River (right tributary of the Obesta River), 3 km from Studenok, 24.5 km from the districts administrative centre Rylsk and 131 km from Kursk.

Slobodka-Ivanovka is located 9 km from the regional highway 38K-017 (Kursk-Lgov- Rylsk-border with Ukraine), 2 km from the inter-municipal highway 38N-352 (38K-017-Gnilovka), on the highway 38N-353 (38N-352-Slobodka-Ivanovka), 3.5 km from the nearest railway stopping point Gudovo (line Khutir-Mykhailivskyi-Vorozhba).

=== Climate ===
According to the Köppen climate classification, Slobodka-Ivanovka is located in the temperate continental climate zone with warm summers and relatively warm winters.

== History ==
The earliest mention of Slobodka-Ivanovka was in 1859.

The village previously went under the name of Yaroshevka.

There are 47 houses in the village, which includes a private subsidiary farm.

=== Russo-Ukrainian War ===
After the start of the Kursk campaign, Ukrainian forces captured the village on 11 August 2024. As of 2026, Ukrainian forces still hold the village. On 26 April 2025, Russia's General Staff of the Armed Forces of the Russian Federation Valery Gerasimov stated that Russia had recaptured every village in Kursk Oblast, which included Slobodka-Ivanovka, although Ukraine disputed the claim.
