= Haivrit =

Israeli rock band

Haivrit העברית
- Origin: Israel
- Genres: Rock
- Years active: 2004–present
- Members: Oron Sherri (vocals, guitar, bass); Eran Peretz (vocals, bass, guitar); Amit Arbel (drums, keyboards)

Haivrit (Hebrew: העברית) are an Israeli rock band, composed of Oron Sherri (vocals, guitar, bass), Eran Peretz (vocals, bass, guitar) and Amit Arbel (drums, keyboards). They started out in 2004 as "The Blush" and later changed their name to "Blush and Lure". They mostly sang in English and played shows in clubs in Tel Aviv and also in Europe. Notably, they played in a Pavement tribute show in Tel Aviv in 2004 and recorded a Hebrew version of "Waiting for the Miracle" for an unofficial Leonard Cohen tribute collection, which wasn't published due to copyright restrictions. They also recorded a complete album of songs in English, but didn't release it.

In late 2005 they changed their name to Haivrit ("The Hebrew") and started performing completely new songs in Hebrew only.

Their debut album Tel Aviv Glamour Life (חיי הזהר של תל־אביב) was released in December 2006 to good reviews and spawned the radio hits "Come" (בוא), "Class Party" (מסיבת כיתה) and "Everything Was Mixed Up" (הכל הסתבך). The band was nominated as "Breakthrough of the Year" at the 2007 Music 24 awards.
