= Ben-Israel =

Hebrew surname

Ben-Israel or Ben-Yisrael is a Hebrew surname, literally meaning 'son of Israel'. Ben Israel is a Hebrew patronymic with the same meaning.

Notable people with the name include:

== Surname ==
- Adi Ben-Israel, American mathematician
- Ben Ammi Ben-Israel, African American-Israeli religious leader
- Danny Ben-Israel, Israeli musician
- Gideon Ben-Yisrael, Israeli politician
- Isaac Ben-Israel, Israeli military scientist, general and politician
- Ron Ben-Israel, Israeli-American pastry chef

== Patronymic ==
- Aharon Shmuel ben Israel Kaidanover, Polish-Lithuanian rabbi
- Haim Ben Israel Benvenishti, Ottoman rabbi
- Joshua ben Israel Benveniste, Ottoman physician and rabbi
- Menasseh Ben Israel, Portuguese rabbi and printer
- Meshullam Phoebus ben Israel Samuel, Polish rabbi
- Moses Ben Israel Isserles, Polish Ashkenazic rabbi, talmudist, and posek
- Solomon ben Israel Moses ha-Levi Alkabets, Ottoman rabbi, kabbalist, and poet

== See also ==
- Ben Yehuda (disambiguation)
- Bar Yehuda
