= Israël (magazine) =

Jewish weekly magazine (1920–1939)

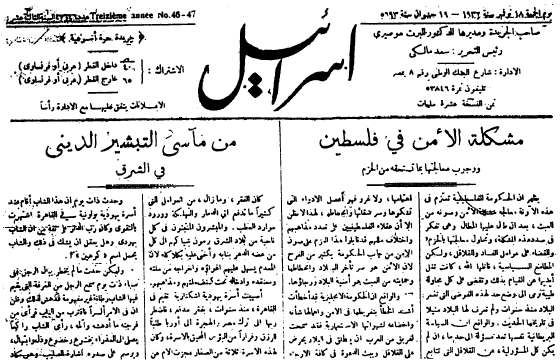
- Editor: Albert Mosseri; Mathilde Mosseri
- Categories: Political magazine
- Frequency: Weekly
- Founder: Albert Mosseri
- Founded: 1920
- First issue: 2 April 1920
- Final issue: 1939
- Country: Egypt
- Based in: Cairo
- Language: Arabic; Hebrew; French

Israël was a trilingual weekly Zionist magazine which was headquartered in Cairo, Egypt. It existed between 1920 and 1939 and was published in three language editions: Arabic, French and Hebrew.

== History and profile ==
Israël was established by Albert Mosseri in Cairo in 1920. It was the official media outlet of Ha Shomer ha Zair, a Jewish organization. The magazine had three language editions, Arabic, French and Hebrew all which were started on 2 April 1920. Albert Mosseri also edited the French edition of the magazine until his death in 1933. His assistant editors were Albert Staraselski and Joseph Mosseri. The Arabic edition was edited by three different individuals, Murad Faraj, Yousef Manufla and Saad Yaqub Maliki. Mathilde Mosseri, wife of Albert Mosseri, edited the Hebrew edition together with Yehoshua Kantrovich. Following the death of her husband Mathilde Mosseri edited the French edition of magazine in the period 1933–1939.

Israël was published on a weekly basis. As of 1920 the magazine was distributed to several regions, including Palestine, Damascus, Beirut, Paris, Baghdad, Cyprus, Basra, Brussels, England and Thessaloniki. Due to tensions about the Palestine issue the magazine was banned in Iraq in September 1933.

The Hebrew edition of the magazine was closed down in 1923, and its Arabic edition ceased publication in 1933. The French edition was folded in 1939.

The magazine had an explicitly Zionist editorial line.
