= Congregation B'nai Israel (Jackson, Tennessee) =

Historic Reform synagogue in Tennessee, US

Congregation B’nai Israel
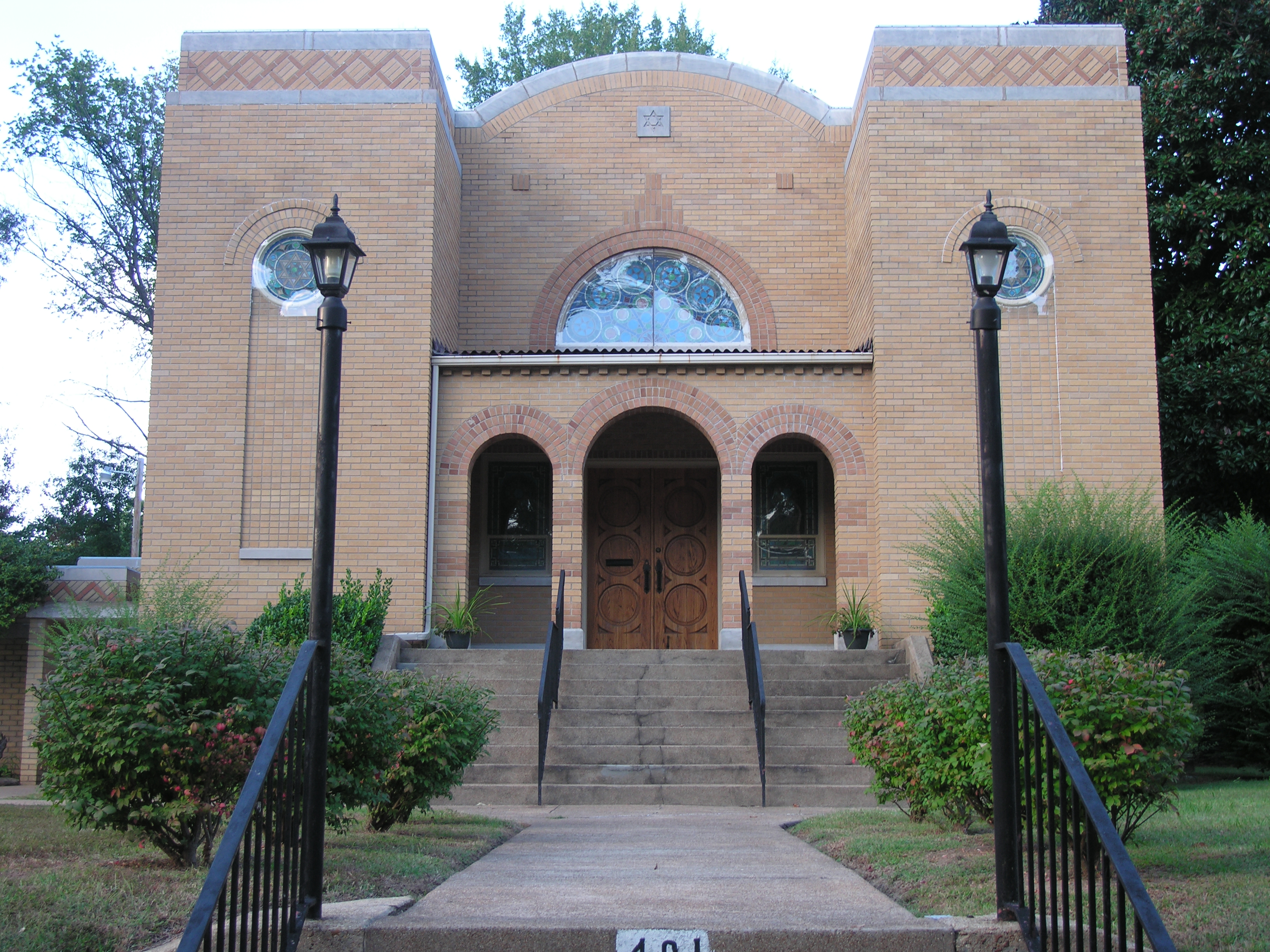

- Location in Tennessee

Religion
- Affiliation: Reform Judaism
- Ecclesiastical or organizational status: Synagogue
- Leadership: Rabbi Cantor John M. Kaplan
- Status: Active

Location
- Location: 401 West Grand Street, Jackson, Tennessee 38308
- Country: United States
- Interactive map of Congregation B’nai Israel
- Coordinates: 35°37′39″N 88°49′28″W

Architecture
- Architect: Carl Heyer
- Type: Synagogue
- Style: Romanesque Revival
- General contractor: Hubert Owen
- Established: 1885 (as a congregation)
- Completed: 1941
- Materials: Brick

Website
- congregationbnai-israel.org
- Congregation B'nai Israel
- U.S. National Register of Historic Places
- Area: less than one acre
- NRHP reference No.: 08000687
- Added to NRHP: July 16, 2008

Congregation B’nai Israel is an historic Reform Jewish congregation and synagogue at 401 West Grand Street in Jackson, Tennessee, in the United States.

The synagogue building was listed on the National Register of Historic Places in 2008.

== History ==
The B'nai Israel congregation was chartered in 1885. In its early years, the congregation conducted services in some of homes of its members and in a hall above M. Tuchfeld's store (more recently known as Kisber's Department Store). The congregation moved into its first permanent home in 1897 when it acquired the former Cumberland Presbyterian Church building on College Street and rededicated it for Jewish worship. In 1907 the congregation chose to affiliate with Reform Judaism, becoming a member of the Union of American Hebrew Congregations.

The Cumberland Presbyterian Church building, continued to serve as the congregation's place of worship until 1941, when the current temple building was completed. Construction of the new building was funded with money accumulated in a building fund that had been started in 1924. The building was designed by Memphis architect Carl Heyer and constructed by Jackson building contractor Hubert Owen. Pews from the Cumberland Presbyterian Church building were installed in the new building; these pews are still in use. Classrooms were added to the building in 1962.

The temple was listed on the National Register of Historic Places on July 16, 2008.
