= Semitic =

Semitic most commonly refers to the Semitic languages, a name used since the 1770s to refer to the language family currently present in West Asia, North and East Africa, and Malta.

Semitic may also refer to:

== People ==
- Ancient Semitic-speaking peoples
- Semitic people, a term used in the grouping of Semitic languages in linguistics, an obsolete term for an ethnic or cultural group, or a partially or completely devalued term for a racial group

== Religions ==
- Ancient Semitic religion
- Semitic religions (disambiguation)

== Other linguistic terms ==
- Proto-Semitic language
- Semitic root
- Semitic studies

== See also ==
- Semitism (disambiguation)
- Shem
