= Kingdom of Israel =

Kingdom of Israel may refer to:

== History ==
- Kingdom of Israel (united monarchy) (1047–931 BCE), the kingdom established by the Israelites and uniting them under a single king
- Kingdom of Israel (Samaria) (930 – c. 720 BCE), the kingdom of northern Israel

== Organizations ==
- Kingdom of Israel (group) better known as the Tzrifin Underground, an Israeli political movement active in the 1950s

== See also ==
- Israel (disambiguation)
- Judah (disambiguation)
- Twelve Tribes (disambiguation)
