= Congregation B'nai Israel (Albuquerque, New Mexico) =

Conservative historic synagogue in New Mexico, United States

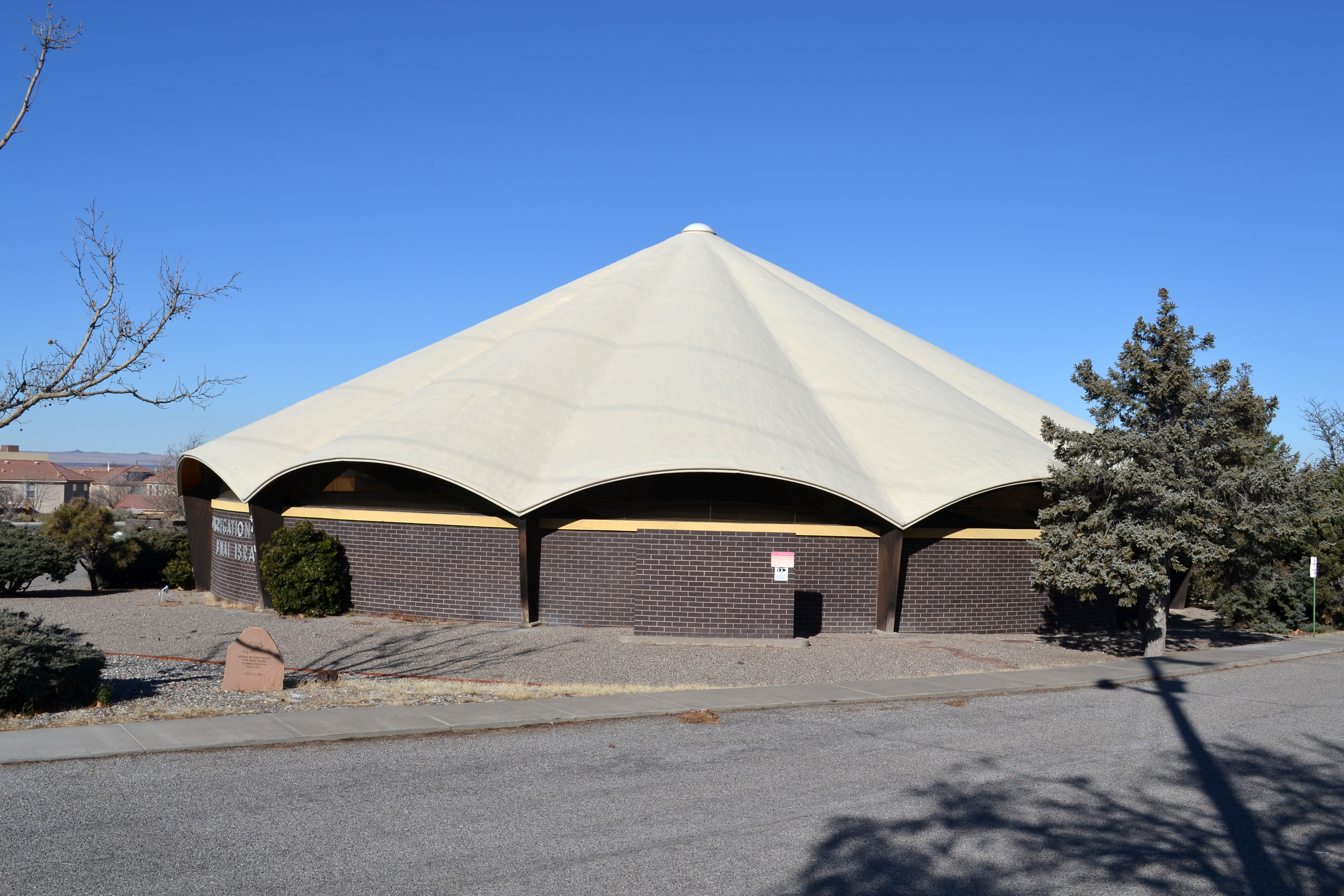
- The synagogue, in 2018

- Location in New Mexico

Religion
- Affiliation: Conservative Judaism
- Ecclesiastical or organisational status: Synagogue
- Leadership: Rabbi Hazzan Jonathan Angress Rabbi Arthur W. Flicker (Emeritus)
- Status: Active

Location
- Location: 4401 Indian School Road NE, Albuquerque, New Mexico 87110
- Country: United States
- Coordinates: 35°6′7″N 106°35′41″W

Architecture
- Architect: George Wynn
- Type: Synagogue architecture
- Style: Expressionist
- Established: 1920 (as a congregation)
- Completed: 1971

Specifications
- Capacity: 500 worshipers
- Height (max): 43 feet (13 m)
- Materials: Polyurethane foam, timber, brick, glass

Website
- bnaiisrael-nm.org
- Congregation B'nai Israel
- U.S. National Register of Historic Places
- NM State Register of Cultural Properties
- NRHP reference No.: 100003674
- NMSRCP No.: 2051

Significant dates
- Added to NRHP: May 2, 2019
- Designated NMSRCP: February 15, 2019

Congregation B'nai Israel is a historic Conservative Jewish congregation and synagogue, located at 4401 Indian School Road NE, in Albuquerque, New Mexico, in the United States. The building is notable for its distinctive Expressionist design by George Wynn, including an unusual undulating conical roof formed from polyurethane foam, as well as its importance in the city's Jewish community. The synagogue was completed in 1971 and was listed on the New Mexico State Register of Cultural Properties and the National Register of Historic Places in 2019.

== History ==
Congregation B'nai Israel was established in 1920, meeting in various temporary locations until the first synagogue was completed in 1941 at Coal and Cedar. By the 1960s, the congregation needed more room to expand and purchased a new site at Indian School and Washington. Fundraising for the new building began in 1967 but was put on hold when the congregation decided to send most of the money to support Israel in the Six-Day War instead. The campaign was restarted in 1968, and ground was broken on the new building in December 1969.

The synagogue was formally dedicated in December 1971 and has remained in use since. The lobby was expanded and remodeled in 1990. In 2019, the building was added to the New Mexico State Register of Cultural Properties and the National Register of Historic Places.

== Architecture ==
The synagogue was designed by local architect George Wynn and comprises a large circular sanctuary with an adjoining social hall and education wing at the rear. The sanctuary is 100 feet (30 m) in diameter and 43 feet (13 m) high with a distinctive polyurethane foam roof shaped like a ribbed tent. The roof is supported by twelve massive pre-stressed laminated fir beams, each weighing over 5,000 pounds (2,300 kg), which were shipped from Oregon by rail. Wynn said he chose the design simply for its emotional impact, and that allusions to the Twelve Tribes of Israel and the desert tents of the Exodus were coincidental, though appropriate.

The space between the beams is filled in with brown brick curtain walls with a glass clerestory under the eaves. The interior of the sanctuary has about 500 seats and a ribbed ceiling of knotty spruce with a skylight at the apex. The rear wing is two stories in height with brown brick walls and a flat roof.
