= Congregation B'nai Israel (Daly City, California) =

Karaite Jewish synagogue in Daly City, California, US

Congregation B’nai Israel
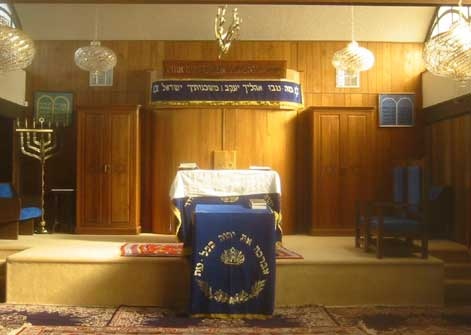
- Interior of the B'nei Israel Karaite synagogue

- Location in San Francisco Bay Area

Religion
- Affiliation: Judaism
- Rite: (Karaite)
- Ecclesiastical or organizational status: Synagogue
- Leadership: Rav. Joseph Moussa (Acting); Rav. Joe Pessah (Emeritus)
- Status: Active

Location
- Location: 1575 Annie Street, Daly City, San Francisco Bay Area, California 94015
- Country: United States
- Interactive map of Congregation B’nai Israel
- Coordinates: 37°41′18″N 122°28′30″W

Architecture
- Type: Synagogue architecture
- Established: c. 1982 (as a congregation)
- Completed: 1994 (purchased an existing synagogue)

Website
- karaites.org

Congregation B'nai Israel is a Karaite Jewish congregation and synagogue, located at 1575 Annie Street, in Daly City, in the San Francisco Bay Area, in California in the United States. It is the only Karaite congregation in the United States. The synagogue building was purchased in 1995 from a former Orthodox congregation called B'nai Israel.

Rabbi Malcolm Cohen served the congregation for 19 years.
