= Abraham Rapoport =

Polish Talmudist

Abraham Rapoport (Schrenzel) was a Polish Talmudist; born at Lemberg (currently Lviv, Ukraine) in 1584; died in 1651 (June 7); son of Rabbi Israel Jehiel Rapoport of Kraków and son-in-law of R. Mordecai Schrenzel of Lemberg. Rapoport was a pupil of R. Joshua Falk ha-Kohen.

For forty-five years he was at the head of a large yeshiva at Lemberg. Being very wealthy, he had no need of seeking a rabbinical position; and he was able, therefore, to expend large sums on behalf of the pupils of his academy. He was president of the Council of Four Lands, and was administrator of the money collected for the poor in the Holy Land.

Rapoport's Etan ha-Ezrachi (printed at Ostrau, 1796) is divided into two parts. Part 1 contains responsa and decisions; part 2, called Qontres Aharon contains sermons on the weekly sections of the Pentateuch.

He is said to have written a number of works which have been lost.

== Bibliography ==
- Azulai, Shem ha-Gedolim, i, No. 17;
- Solomon Buber, Anshe Shem, pp. 7–13, Kraków, 1895.
