= Bar Yehuda =

Bar Yehuda is a Hebrew language surname literally meaning "Son of Yehuda". Notable people with this surname include:

- Rav Shmuel bar Yehudah
- Yisrael Bar-Yehuda (1895–1965), Zionist activist and Israeli politician

== See also ==
- Ben Yehuda
