= Azrael (disambiguation) =

Azrael is the traditional name of the angel of death in many religions.

Azrael may also refer to:

== Arts and entertainment ==
- Azrael (film), a horror film directed by E. L. Katz and starring Samara Weaving
- "Azrael", an episode of the Indian TV series Sacred Games
- "Azrael" (Gotham episode), an episode of a DC Comics TV show

=== Characters ===
- Azrael (DC Comics), an alias for multiple characters
  - Azrael (comic book), an American series published by DC Comics
  - Azrael, a mysterious character with the same alias who was an ally of the Teen Titans
  - "Azrael" (Gotham character), from the TV series Gotham
- Commander Azrael, Warhammer 40,000
- Muruta Azrael, a fictional character in the anime Mobile Suit Gundam SEED
- Bruno Azrael, a fictional character in the anime Gundam SEED DESTINY
- Azrael, a character from the film Dogma
- Azrael, the cat of Gargamel, the villain in The Smurfs
- Rabbi Azrael, a main character in the play The Dybbuk by S. Ansky
- Azrael, a character in the novel series No Game No Life
- Azrael, a single-appearance character in The Amazing World of Gumball
- Azrael, a transdimensional demon of light from Brave Saga 2
- Azrael, a fictional character from the BlazBlue fighting games
- Azrael, a death-sensing cat in Stephen King's novel Doctor Sleep and its film adaptation

== People ==
- Abu Azrael (born 1978), also known as the "Angel of Death" (Arabic: ملاك الموت), is a commander of the Kataib al-Imam Ali, an Iraqi Shi'a militia group of the Popular Mobilization Forces that is fighting ISIL/ISIS (Islamic State of Iraq and the Levant) in Iraq
- Deborah Azrael, Harvard School of Public Health researcher
- Edward Azrael (1907–2001), American lawyer
- Jeremy Azrael (1935–2009), American political scientist and father of Deborah
- Louis Azrael (1904–1981), American journalist
- Mary Azrael (born 1944), American author and poet

== See also ==
- Israel (disambiguation)
- Izrael (disambiguation)
- Azriel (disambiguation)
- Asriel (disambiguation)
- Asrael, a leggenda or opera in four acts
- Asrael Symphony, Czech composer Josef Suk's Second Symphony
