= Azriel =

Azriel (or Ezriel) is a Hebrew name meaning "God helps". Notable people with the name include:

== People ==
- Azriel, the father of Seraiah in the Bible, see Jeremiah 36#Verse 26
- Azriel of Gerona (c. 1160–c. 1238), Catalan kabbalist
- Azriel Graeber (born 1948), Talmudic Scholar and founder of the Jewish Scholarship Society
- Azriel Hildesheimer (1820–1899), German rabbi
- Azriel Zelig Hausdorf (1826–1905), Prussian philanthropist
- Azriel Lévy (born 1934), Logician, Hebrew University, Jerusalem
- Azriel Rabinowitz (1905–1941), Lithuanian rabbi and Holocaust victim
- Azriel Rosenfeld (1931–2004), American professor and expert on computer image analysis
- Asriel Günzig (also known as Azriel Günzig, Ezriel Günzig, or other spellings), a rabbi, scholar, bookseller, editor, and writer
- Ezriel Carlebach (1909–1956), Israeli journalist

== Fictional characters ==
- The title character's name in the Anne Rice novel Servant of the Bones
- Azriel, a character in A Court of Thorns and Roses by Sarah J. Maas
- Azriel, the supernatural antagonist in the Netflix series Warrior Nun (TV series)
- Asriel Dreemurr, God of hyperdeath in Undertale (Game) and colledge student in Deltarune (Game)

== Other uses ==
- Azri'el, a moshav in central Israel
- "Azriel (Angel of Death)" and "Azriel Revisited", songs by rock group The Nice

== See also ==
- Asriel (disambiguation)
- Asrael, a leggenda or opera in four acts
- Asrael Symphony, Czech composer Josef Suk's Second Symphony
- Azrael (disambiguation)
