= Passager Books =

American publishing house

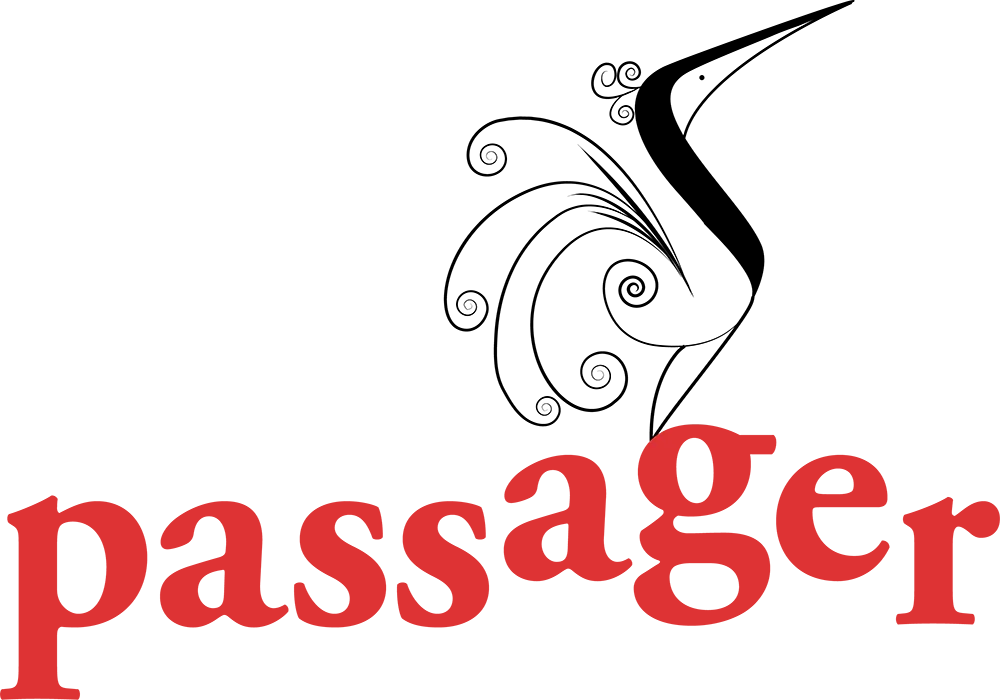
- Editor-in-Chief: Rosanne Singer
- Senior Editor: Mary Azrael
- Executive Director & Design: Christine Drawl
- Podcast Producer: Jon Shorr
- Categories: Nature, History, Literature, Age, Culture
- Frequency: Biannually
- Founder: Kendra Kopelke
- Founded: 1990
- First issue: 1990
- Country: United States
- Based in: Baltimore, Maryland, United States
- Language: English
- Website: Passagerbooks.com

Passager Books is an American nonprofit literary publisher dedicated to writers over 50. Passager publishes a semiannual journal featuring poetry, short fiction, memoir; books by writers who have been published in the journal; and a weekly podcast. The press is based in Baltimore, Maryland and was founded in 1990 at the University of Baltimore by creative writing MFA director Kendra Kopelke. Passager is an independent 501(c)(3) nonprofit organization. It awards The Henry Morgenthau III Prize.

Passager hosts live and Zoom writing workshops and readings.

Passager and its writers have been the subject of stories in the Baltimore Sun, WBJC-FM, The Washington Post, JMore Living, Women Over 70, Erickson Tribune, The Beacon Newspapers (Note: Newspapers covering the D.C. Metro area and Baltimore, MD.) and The Poet and the Poem.

== Staff ==
Editor-in-Chief: Rosanne Singer (2019–Present)

Senior Editor: Mary Azrael (1990s-Present)

Executive Director & Design: Christine Drawl (2015–Present)

Podcast Producer: Jon Shorr (2015–Present)

Founding Editor: Kendra Kopelke (1990 - June 2025)

== Henry Morgenthau III Prize ==
The Henry Morgenthau III Prize is awarded every two years, to a U.S. writer age 70 and older for a first book of poetry. The award was established in 2018 with the Morgenthau children to honor Henry Morgenthau III, who began writing poetry in his 90s. Winners receive $2,000 and publication of their book.

Past Winners
Year	Poet
2024	Winifred Hughes, The Village of New Ghosts
2022	Mark Elber, Headstone
2020	Dennis H. Lee, Tidal Wave

== Notable Contributors ==
- Sarah Yerkes
- Wilderness Sarchild
- Henry Morgenthau III
- Joyce Abell
- Nancy Davidoff Kelton
