= Asriel (disambiguation) =

Asriel is son of Manasseh in the Bible.

Asriel may also refer to:

- Asriel (band), a Japanese rock band
- Asriel Günzig, a rabbi, scholar, bookseller, editor and writer
- Lord Asriel, a character in Philip Pullman's His Dark Materials trilogy
- Asriel Dreemurr, a character in the 2015 video game Undertale

== See also ==
- Asrael, a leggenda or opera in four acts
- Asrael Symphony, Czech composer Josef Suk's Second Symphony
- Azrael (disambiguation)
- Azriel (disambiguation)
- Princess Asrial, a character in the American comic book series Ninja High School
