= 121st Engineer Battalion (United States) =

American military unit

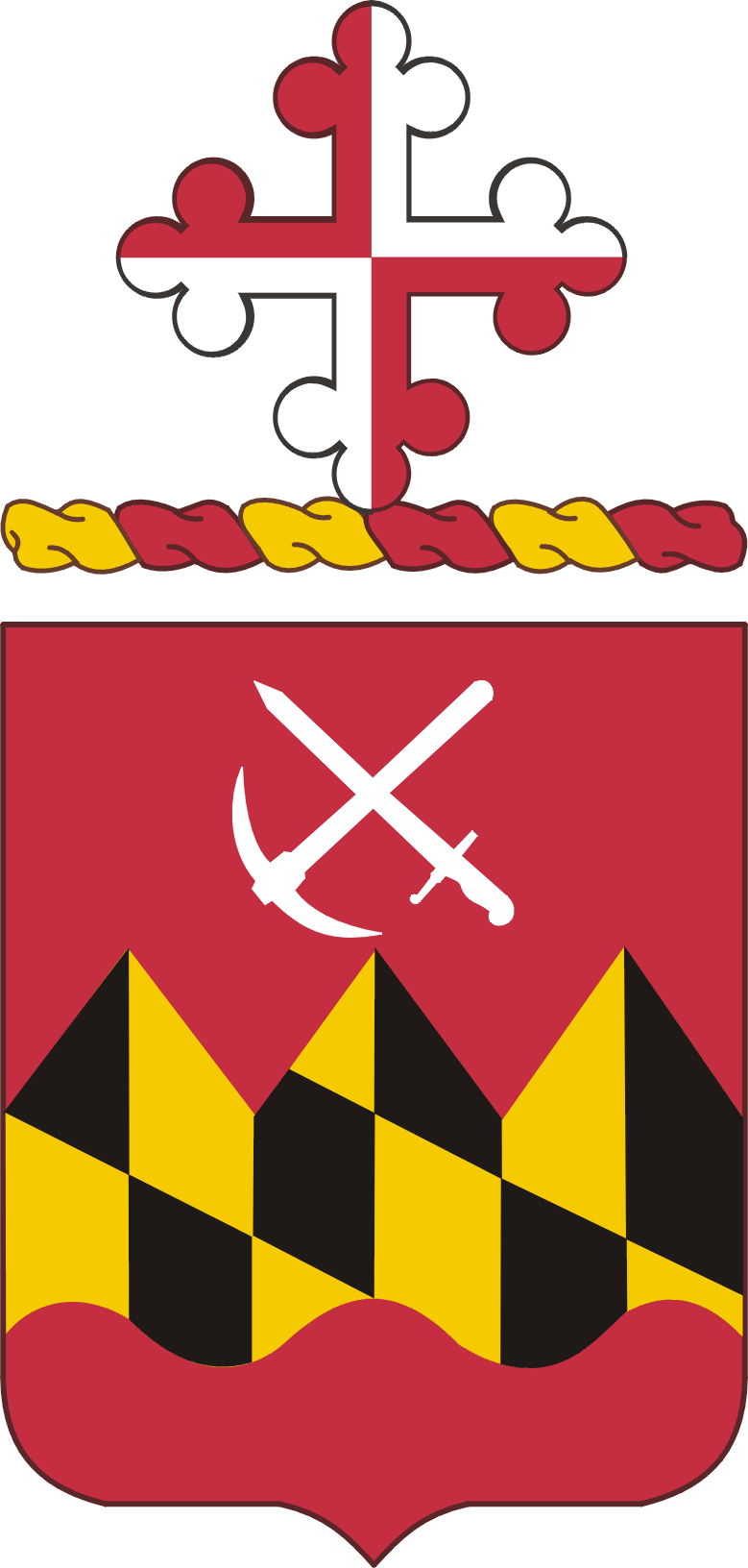
- Post-1948 coat of arms
- Active: 1942- World War II; 1948 onwards
- Country: United States of America
- Branch: Maryland Army National Guard
- Type: Engineer
- Motto: 'DCNG '"Nihil Tememus" (We Fear Nothing) MDNG "Praevius" (Lead the Way)
- Engagements: DCNG Normandy Invasion MDNG None

Insignia
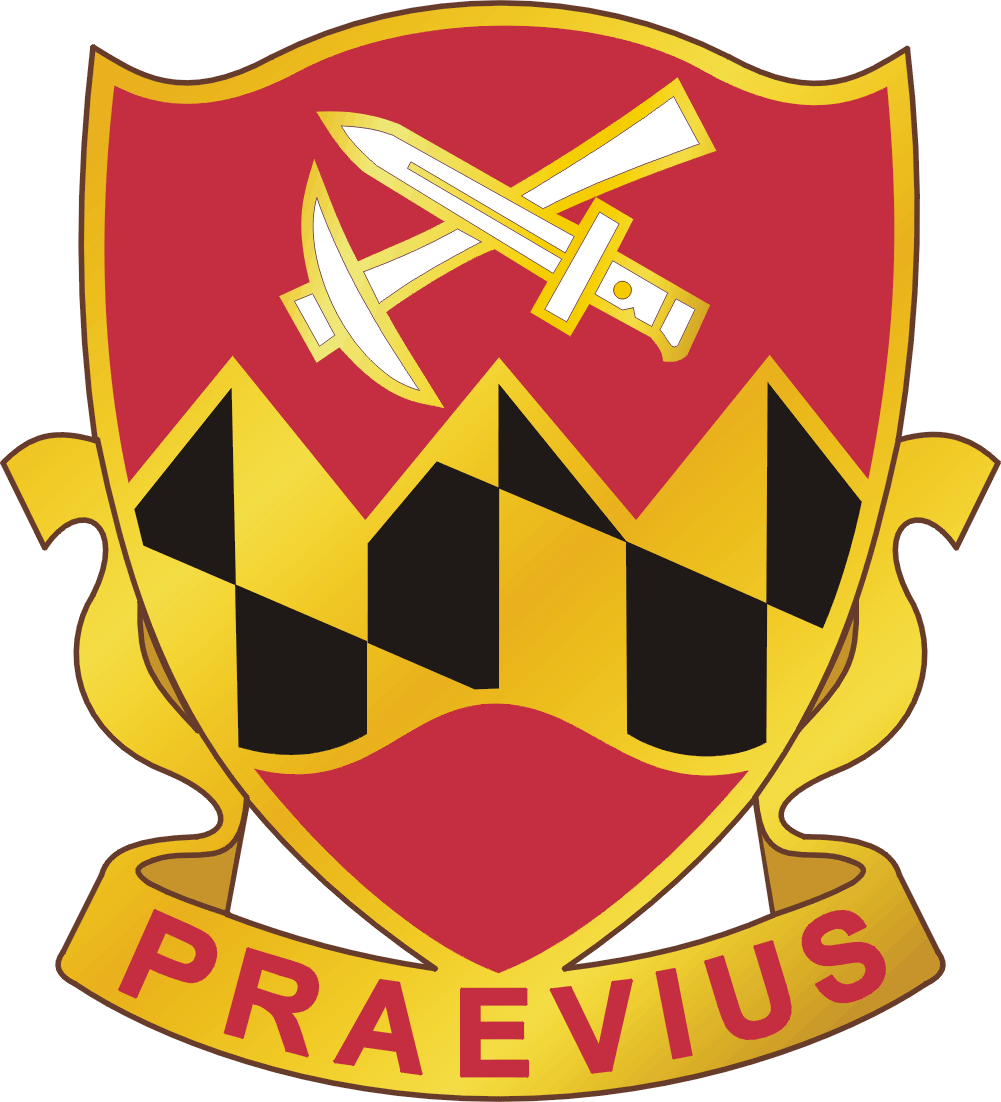
- Post 1948 distinctive unit insignia

The 121st Engineer Combat Battalion is the name of two separate U.S. Army National Guard units. During World War II, the first unit designated the 121st Engineer Battalion was one of the first American units to land in Normandy on D-Day.

== History ==
=== Interwar period ===
The 121st Engineer Battalion traces its lineage to the 5th Infantry Regiment of the District of Columbia National Guard. The unit was originally created in 1918, and in 1921, it was converted to engineers and redesignated as the 121st Engineer Regiment, assigned to the 29th Division, which also consisted of units from Maryland, Virginia, and Pennsylvania. The 121st served in the division in place of New Jersey's 114th Engineer Regiment that had been assigned to the 29th in World War I, but was now subordinated to the newly created New Jersey-New York 44th Division.

The regimental headquarters was organized and federally recognized on 5 February 1924. The regiment conducted annual summer training at various locations to include Fort Washington, Maryland, Camp Simms, District of Columbia, Camp A.A. Humphreys, Virginia, Virginia Beach, Virginia, and Camp Albert C. Ritchie, Cascade, Maryland. The regiment was inducted into federal service on 3 February 1941 and transferred 4 February 1941 to Fort George G. Meade, Maryland.

One of the 121st's most distinguished members was Earle G. Wheeler, who began his military career as a private in Company C in 1926, and later rose to full general, serving as Chief of Staff of the Army from 1962 to 1964 and later as Chairman of the Joint Chiefs of Staff from 1964 to 1970.

=== World War II ===
In May 1942, the 121st was stationed at Fort Meade, and at the same time, the 37th Infantry Division of the Ohio National Guard was at Fort Indiantown Gap, Pennsylvania.

The 37th had been alerted for movement to England, and sent its 112th Engineer Combat Battalion ahead as part of the advance party. Orders were changed, and the 37th was diverted for service in the Pacific Theater. There was no time to recall the 112th, or to find and assign a new battalion. The War Department instead ordered the 121st Engineers, less five officers and 180 men, from Fort Meade to Fort Indiantown Gap, and the unit was redesignated the 117th Engineer Combat Battalion.

The new 117th Engineers shipped out to Fiji, and saw extensive combat in the Philippines. The District of Columbia guardsmen worked under enemy fire, building and repairing 64 bridges, destroying enemy held buildings and tank obstacles, and participating in river crossings with "consummate skill and courage."

A training battalion was organized around the cadre, and was supplemented with Selective Service men sent from Fort Devens, Massachusetts, and Fort Hayes, Ohio. In June 1942, the battalion reassumed the designation of the 121st Engineer Battalion.

==== D-Day landings ====
On 6 June 1944, the 121st Engineer Combat Battalion landed on Omaha Beach in Normandy with the first American forces. The unit endured much damage to its equipment and casualties among its soldiers, but after some recovery it continued to assist in the invasion. For its action during the invasion the 121st was awarded the French Croix de Guerre.

=== After World War II ===
At the end of World War II the 121st Engineer Battalion was deactivated. It was later reactivated within the District of Columbia Army National Guard, as the 163rd Military Police Battalion. Sometime in 1990, the battalion appears to have been redesignated the DCARNG's 372nd Military Police Battalion, with the retention of all its history, lineage and honors. This appears to have taken place in order to take up the legacy of the 372nd Infantry Regiment of the DC ARNG.

The 121st Engineer Battalion were reformed as a Maryland Army National Guard unit in 1948 and federally recognized on 8 March 1948. Although the new unit in Maryland carried the same title as the World War II unit, under U.S. Army lineage rules, it was a new unit with no previous history. Until 1968, it served as the 29th Infantry Division’s engineer battalion.

The new battalion played a pivotal role in the crowd control efforts after being called in to assist the local authorities during the race riots that took place in Baltimore and Cambridge in the 1960s.

After the September 11 terrorist attacks members of the Battalion volunteered for security duty.

The 121st Engineer Battalion (Corps)(Mech) inactivated in August 2006.

== Sources ==
- Balkoski, Joseph. The Maryland National Guard: A History of Maryland’s Military Forces, 1634-1991. Baltimore, MD: Guard, 1991. Print.
