= Joseph A. Farinholt =

American decorated soldier

Joseph Alfred Farinholt
- T/Sgt. Joseph A. Farinholt circa 1942
- Born: July 17, 1922; Catonsville, Maryland, U.S.
- Died: June 11, 2002 (aged 79)
- Military career
- Allegiance: United States
- Branch: United States Army
- Rank: Technical Sergeant
- Nickname: "Lightning"
- Service number: 20343338
- Units: 175th Infantry Regiment, 29th Infantry Division
- Conflicts: World War II: Battle of Normandy; Battle of Aachen; Operation Queen
- Awards: Silver Star with three oak leaf clusters Bronze Star; Purple Heart

Joseph Alfred Farinholt (July 17, 1922 – June 11, 2002) is thought to be the only enlisted man in the history of the U.S. military to receive four awards of the Silver Star, the United States third highest decoration for valor in combat.

== Service ==
Joseph Farinholt was born in Catonsville, Maryland, in 1922. In 1938, he lied about his age to enlist in the Maryland National Guard's Company B, 5th Regiment (The Dandy Fifth). Farinholt was mobilized with his unit for service in World War II in January 1941, at which time the unit was reorganized as the 175th Infantry Regiment, 29th Infantry Division. Corporal Farinholt was assigned to the anti-tank platoon of Headquarters Company, 3rd Battalion, in which he initially served as an assistant gun-crew chief manning a 57 mm towed anti-tank gun, an American-produced British "6 Pounder".

=== First Silver Star ===
Farinholt earned his first Silver Star on July 13, 1944, near Saint Lô in Normandy, France when he fully exposed himself to enemy fire and with complete disregard for his own safety, neutralized an enemy mortar and anti-armor weapon, so that his battalion's attack could advance. For this action Farinholt was promoted to staff sergeant.

=== Second Silver Star ===
His second Silver Star came five days later on July 18, 1944, when he led three daring raids in four days to recapture weapons and equipment thought lost to the enemy. Baltimore News-Post correspondent Louis Azreal heard of Farinholt's exploits in the Normandy campaign and went looking for the story. On August 19, 1944, an article appeared on the front page of the News-Post with the headline "Baltimorean Wins Tank Raid Medal;" all of Baltimore now knew of the man whose commander called him "Lightning."

=== Third Silver Star ===
Promoted to technical sergeant, and now the senior non-commissioned officer in his platoon, Farinholt earned his third Silver Star in Germany's Aachen Gap on October 13, 1944. In this selfless action, Technical Sergeant Farinholt saved several lives while at great risk to his personal safety; in the midst of a blistering artillery barrage, he exposed himself to enemy fire and personally evacuated to safety several badly wounded men.

=== Fourth Silver Star ===
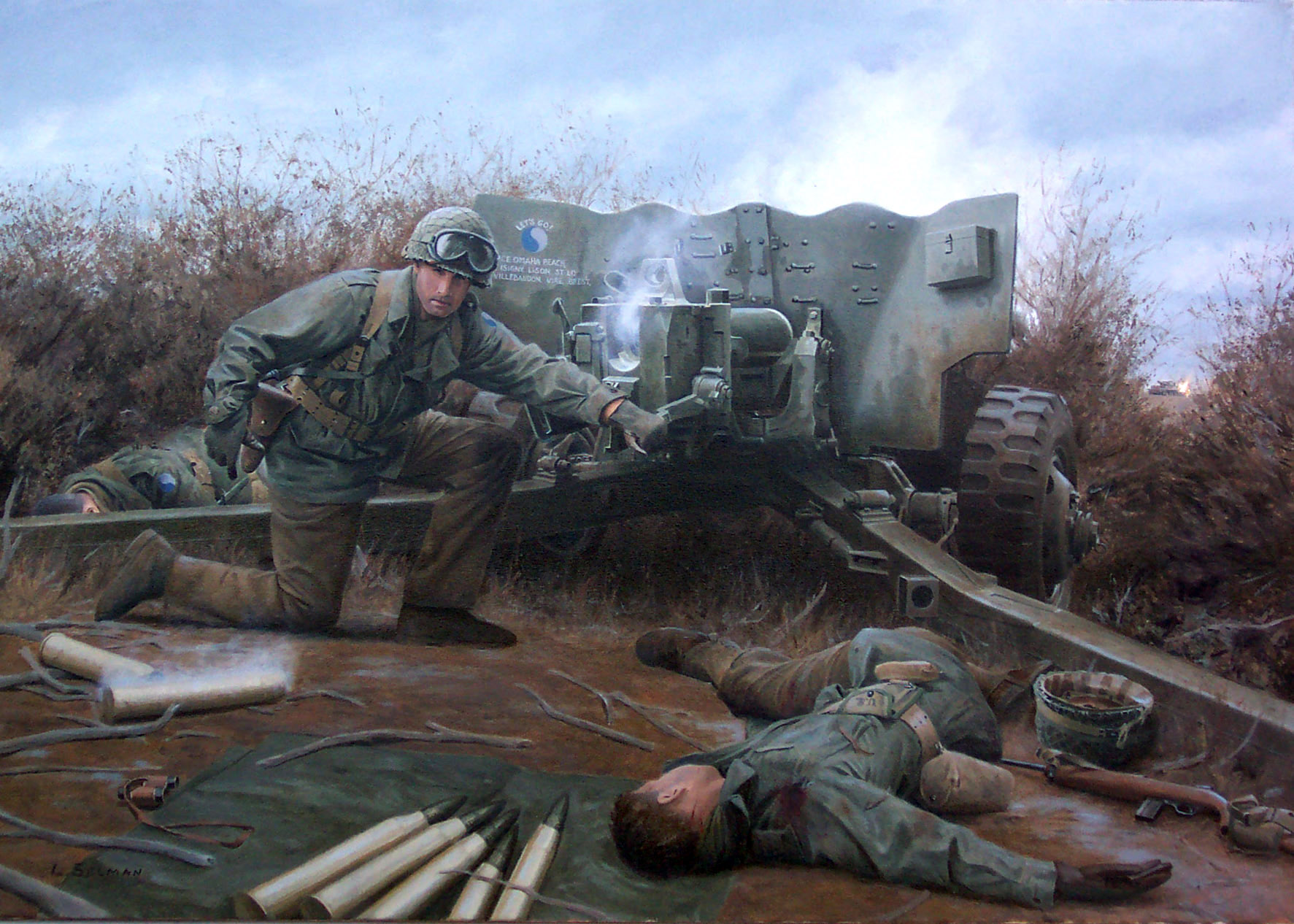
"Lightning at Bourheim" from the National Guard Heritage Series

Farinholt's fourth Silver Star was earned on November 26, 1944, in Bourheim, Germany. The 175th Infantry had captured Bourheim three days earlier, but had to fight off at least six attempts by the Germans to retake the town. In the enemy's final attempt on November 26, they attacked with a heavy force that included Tiger I tanks from Schwere Panzer Abteilung (Funklenk) 301.

After one of Farinholt's antitank gun crews was knocked out of action by a Tiger leading an armored column into Bourheim, he personally manned the gun, firing and neutralizing the tank by hitting a left rear road wheel and knocking off its track. In doing so, he temporarily blocked the enemy's route and brought to a halt their armored and infantry advance, but he was seriously wounded when the tank's machine gunner returned fire. Farinholt suffered 26 bullet and shrapnel wounds to his body, including having the tibia in his right leg completely shattered. Despite his severe injuries, and while still under fire, he managed to crawl to a nearby jeep in which he drove, with one leg, to the 3rd Battalion command post to warn its leaders of the coming attack. Farinholt's report led to an airstrike by P-47 Thunderbolts which decimated the attacking Germans.

In 2001, Farinholt's fourth Silver Star was reviewed by the Army Board for the Correction of Military Records (ABCMR) for an upgrade to the Medal of Honor or Distinguished Service Cross. Despite acknowledging the veracity of Farinholt's valor and actions critical to the 175th Infantry's defense of Bourheim, the ABCMR declined to recommend upgrading the decoration, primarily because of a lack of living eyewitnesses who could make the Medal of Honor recommendation. The ABCMR also cited a reluctance to overrule the decision of the commanders on the ground at that time, even if it could be demonstrated that decision was shortsighted.

It has been incorrectly reported that the paperwork for an upgrade of Farinholt's fourth Silver Star was lost during the September 11, 2001 terrorist attack at the Pentagon.

== Repercussions ==
Farinholt spent the next two years in Army hospitals, recovering from his wounds. Doctors were able to save his shattered right leg; however, the wound never completely closed and for 58 years, until his death in 2002, Farinholt cleaned and dressed the open wound twice each day.

In 2005, The National Guard Bureau commissioned a painting by Larry Selman of Farinholt's November 1944 action in Bourheim, Germany, for its Heritage Series, which depicts important battlefield contributions in American military history made by the National Guard.

== Other awards ==
Farinholt's military awards and decorations include: the Combat Infantryman Badge, Silver Star Medal (with 3 Oak Leaf Clusters), Bronze Star, Purple Heart Good Conduct Medal, European-African-Middle Eastern Campaign Medal (with Arrowhead and 4 Battle Stars), American Defense Service Medal, American Campaign Medal, World War II Victory Medal and Belgian Croix de Guerre for valor.

- Silver Star with three oak leaf clusters
- Bronze Star
- Purple Heart
- Army Good Conduct Medal
- American Defense Service Medal with Fleet Clasp
- American Campaign Medal
- European-African-Middle Eastern Campaign Medal with Arrowhead and 4 battle stars
- World War II Victory Medal
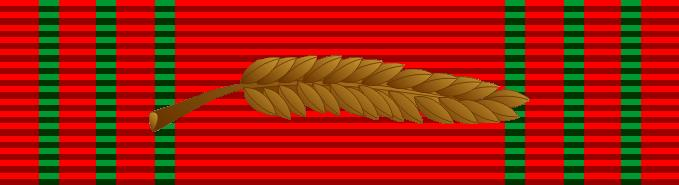
- Belgian Croix de Guerre with palm
- Combat Infantryman Badge
