= Lou Azrael =

- Born: Louis Azrael; 1904
- Died: December 22, 1981 (aged 76–77); Baltimore, Maryland
- Occupation: Journalist
- Known for: Was awarded the Medal of Freedom for his war reporting

Lou Azrael (1904-1981) was a journalist who spent most of his six decade career in Baltimore, but who also served, notably, as a war correspondent, during World War II.

Secretary of War Robert P. Patterson honored war correspondents, including Azrael, at an event in Washington, on November 23, 1946. In 1949 he received the Medal of Freedom from Dwight D. Eisenhower.

Azrael started working for his first newspaper, the Baltimore Sun in 1920, when he was sixteen. During his career he worked for three other papers, the Baltimore News, the Baltimore Daily Post and The News American.

He was embedded with the 29th Infantry Division, and provided frontline reporting on its activities from the Invasion of Normandy, through the Battle of the Bulge, to Victory in Europe.
