= Patrick Regan (Medal of Honor, 1918) =

United States Army Medal of Honor recipient (1882–1943)

Patrick J. Regan
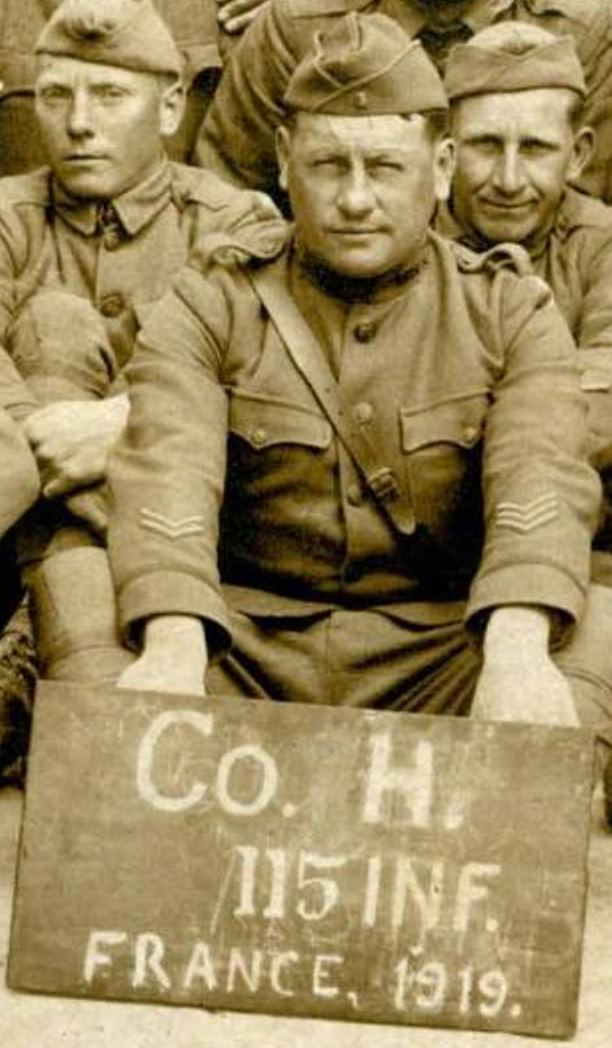
- Regan in uniform, 1919
- Born: March 25, 1882; Middleborough, Massachusetts, U.S.
- Died: October 30, 1943 (aged 61)
- Burial place: Mount Olivet Cemetery, Bloomfield, New Jersey
- Military career
- Branch: United States Army
- Rank: Second Lieutenant
- Units: 115th Infantry, 29th Division
- Conflicts: World War I
- Awards: Medal of Honor; Purple Heart (2)

Patrick J. Regan (March 25, 1882 – October 30, 1943) was an officer in the United States Army who received the Medal of Honor for his actions during World War I.

== Biography ==
Regan was born in Middleborough, Massachusetts on March 25, 1882 and died October 30, 1943. He is buried in Mount Olivet Cemetery, Bloomfield, New Jersey.

== Medal of Honor citation ==
Rank and organization: Second Lieutenant, U.S. Army, 115th Infantry, 29th Division. Place and date: At Bois-de-Consenvoye, France; October 8, 1918. Entered service at: Los Angeles, California. Birth: March 25, 1882; Middleborough, Massachusetts. General Orders: War Department, General Orders No. 50 (April 12, 1919).

Citation:

While leading his platoon against a strong enemy machinegun nest which had held up the advance of two companies, Second Lieutenant Regan divided his men into three groups, sending one group to either flank, and he himself attacking with an automatic rifle team from the front. Two of the team were killed outright, while Second Lieutenant Regan and the third man were seriously wounded, the latter unable to advance. Although severely wounded, Second Lieutenant Regan dashed with empty pistol into the machinegun nest, capturing 30 Austrian gunners and four machineguns. This gallant deed permitted the companies to advance, avoiding a terrific enemy fire. Despite his wounds, he continued to lead his platoon forward until ordered to the rear by his commanding officer.

== Military awards ==
Regan's military decorations and awards include the following:

1st row	Medal of Honor	Purple Heart w/ one bronze oak leaf cluster	Army of Cuban Occupation Medal
2nd row	Philippine Campaign Medal	Mexican Service Medal	World War I Victory Medal w/two bronze service stars to denote credit for the Meuse-Argonne and Defensive Sector battle clasps.
3rd row	Ordre national de la Légion d'honneur degree of Knight (French Republic)	Croix de guerre 1914–1918 w/ bronze palm (French Republic)	Croce al Merito di Guerra (Italy)

== See also ==
- List of Medal of Honor recipients
- List of Medal of Honor recipients for World War I
