= Azriel Graeber =

Azriel Graeber (born 1948) is a freelance journalist, scholar, PhD and founder of the Jewish Scholarship Society. He is also known under his pen name, Azriel Radifker. He has contributed to several journals, periodicals and newspapers ranging on many topics. His organization which is a branch of his journalistic interests, actively attempts to bridge several sectors of Judaism together.

== Biography ==
Graeber, born in 1948, is the second child born to Holocaust survivors. He wrote about his experience as the child of survivors in an essay published in Louis Finkelstein Quarterly (Fall 1978). He describes the sensitivity that he fostered for all victims of oppression under governmental abuses of power.

In 1974 he was awarded a PhD from Dropsie College in Jewish history for his study on the ability of building a historical narrative of the Jewish people based on questions posed to Jewish law deciders from the 12th century to today. A main focus of his thesis was on the responsa of Rabad of Posquières, later to be the subject of a book by Isadore Twersky of Harvard. He also received a B.Th from Derech Ayson Seminary.

From 1999 through 2003 he served as director of The Tri-State Jewish Community Council. He was also on the directors board of the Bal Teshuva Halfway House of New York, and is currently the president of The Jewish Scholarship Society.

Graeber has never retained any formal teaching positions, although he was listed as holder of the Akiba and Sara Gurtner Chair of Jewish Studies at Touro College for the scholastic year of 1992. His absence was due to his contracting an obscure psychological disorder, Capgras syndrome. He regularly submits papers to various Jewish and secular journals for publication.

After a trip to Israel in 1997 he authored an essay on the need for the inclusion of Yiddishist principles into the fabric of Orthodox Jewish life. He wrote:

Only through the acceptance of Yiddishism will Judaism finally after its 2,000 year exile reach the apex of its purpose...The opposition to Yiddishism historically was primerally from the extreme right wing of the religion. The modern Jewish community should not fear integration.

The article was highly controversial and much debate ensued. The debate within the Jewish community led Graeber to found the Jewish Scholarship Society.

== The JSS ==
The Jewish Scholarship Society, also known as (in Yiddish) Der Yiddisher Gelerntkeit Gelzelshaft, according to its mission statement is to "mesh together Yiddishist principles with an active Jewish lifestyle". The organizations headquarters in Lawrence, New York houses a vast library. The libraries holdings include several antique items of significant historical importance as well as books ranging on topics from the Social Sciences to biographies on notable Jewish personalities.

It was founded in 1997 in New York. Its member base now exceeds 4,500, with members from several different countries and backgrounds. All prospective members must provide proof of their Orthodoxy with their application.

== Scholarship ==
Graeber, as freelance journalist and scholar, has written on many topics, mainly within the scope of Jewish studies. He has been published in most Jewish newspapers, as well as on several on-line news sources. He has also been published in secular journals. Subjects of his writing have included graphology, rabbinical history, dangerous animals and several works of fiction. His most recent essay, "Eybeschutz–Emden Controversy Alive And Well", appeared this past March.

Several notable essays include: "The Spanish Cholov Yisroel Controversy of 1763 and its effects on the Jews of Barcelona", "Slobodka Yeshiva: Myth or Musser", "How Hungarian Jews have ruined American Judaism: A Complete History" and "West Side vs. East Side: Two communities. One park".

His article "How Hungarian Jews have ruined American Judaism: A Complete History" won the Rabbi Solomon Schechter Literary Award, and was published in March 1983 in "Rabbi Louis Finkelstein Quarterly". Other awards include the annually awarded Chazon Ish Grant for his contribution to the study of the prohibitions involved in Amirah L'Otzmoi.

He is currently working on his first book, tentatively titled The Dewey Decimal System's Jewish Inventors.
