= Jeremy Azrael =

American political scientist (1935–2009)

Jeremy Richard Azrael (March 23, 1935 – March 19, 2009) was an American political scientist known for his expertise on the economy of the Soviet Union.

Azrael was born on March 23, 1935, in Baltimore, Maryland. He was educated at Harvard University where he received his bachelor's, master's, and doctorate in government and taught political science at the University of Chicago from 1961 to 1980. He began working at the RAND Corporation in 1974 before leaving to take several government positions. These included being a guest analyst at the CIA and a "charter member" of the Nationalities Working Group, of the National Security Council.

He rejoined RAND in 1985, serving as a professor at the Pardee RAND Graduate School from then until 1990. Beginning in 1993, he was the director of the RAND Center for Russia and Eurasia. He became director of the RAND Business Leaders Forum in 1996, a year before it was formally launched.

Azrael died on March 19, 2009, at his home in Sherman Oaks, California, after suffering from lymphoma. He was survived by his wife Julia Holm, son David Azrael, and three daughters (Deborah Azrael, Ruth Azrael, and Abigail Azrael) from a previous marriage. After his death, several of Azrael's colleagues established the Jeremy R. Azrael Scholarship, a full-tuition scholarship awarded annually by the Pardee Rand Graduate School to a first-year student from a former state of the Soviet Union.
