= Deborah Azrael =

American public health researcher

- Education: Radcliffe College, Harvard School of Public Health, Harvard University
- Scientific career
- Fields: Public health, health policy
- Workplaces: Harvard School of Public Health
- Thesis: Firearms: use and storage at home and use in suicides by children (2001)

Deborah Azrael is an American public health researcher. She is a research associate in the Harvard School of Public Health's Department of Health Policy and Management, and the associate director of the Harvard Youth Violence Prevention Center. She is also the research director of the Harvard Injury Control Research Center, and a major figure involved in the firearm-related research conducted there.

== Education ==
Azrael received her B.A. from Radcliffe College in 1983, her M.S. from the Harvard School of Public Health in 1994, and her Ph.D. from Harvard University in 2001.

== Research ==
Azrael is known for studying gun violence and gun ownership. For example, a 2016 survey she conducted found that 3% of American adults owned half of the roughly 265 million guns in the United States. Another survey she led found that almost 40% of gun owners did not undergo a background check prior to obtaining their most recent gun. Her research has also shown that the vast majority of non-gun owners would feel less safe if there were more guns in their communities, and that female gun owners were much more likely to report the same thing. She has also conducted research on mass shootings in the United States, and found that the rate of these shootings tripled from 2011 to 2014.

== Personal life ==
Azrael is the daughter of political scientist Jeremy R. Azrael, who died in 2009 and was known for his expertise on the Russian economy. She is married to Tom Stoddard.
