= 29th Infantry Division (United States) =

US Army National Guard formation

- Shoulder sleeve insignia of the 29th Infantry Division
- Active: 18 July 1917–30 May 1919; 31 July 1923–17 January 1946; 23 October 1946–1 February 1968; 1 December 1971–present
- Country: United States
- Type: Infantry
- Size: Division
- Part of: Army National Guards of Virginia, Maryland, North Carolina, Florida, West Virginia and Kentucky
- Garrison/HQ: Fort Belvoir, Virginia, U.S.
- Nicknames: "Blue and Gray" (special designation)
- Mottos: "Twenty-nine, let's go!"
- Engagements: World War I; Meuse-Argonne; Alsace 1918; World War II; Normandy; Northern France; Rhineland; Central Europe; Bosnia-Herzegovina; War on terror; Afghanistan; Iraq

Commanders
- Current commander: MG Christopher J Samulski
- Command Sergeant Major: CSM Eric J Saxton

Insignia
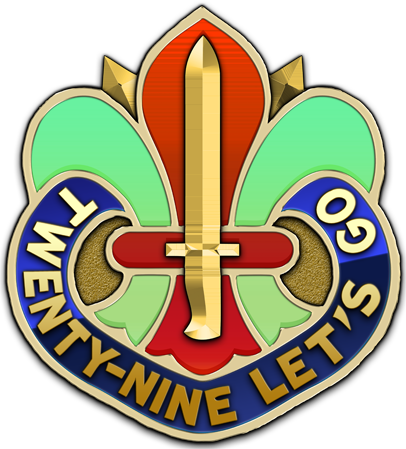
- Distinctive unit insignia

- Flag

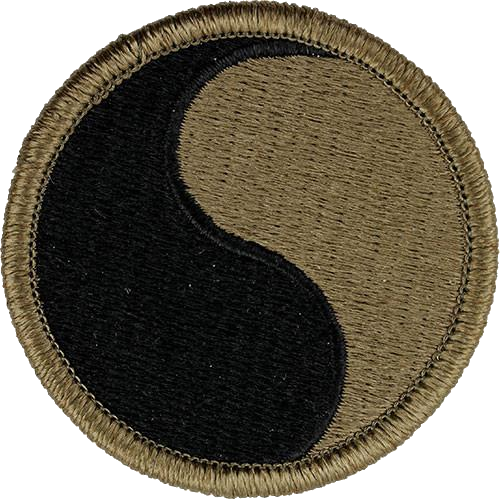
- Shoulder sleeve insignia (subdued)

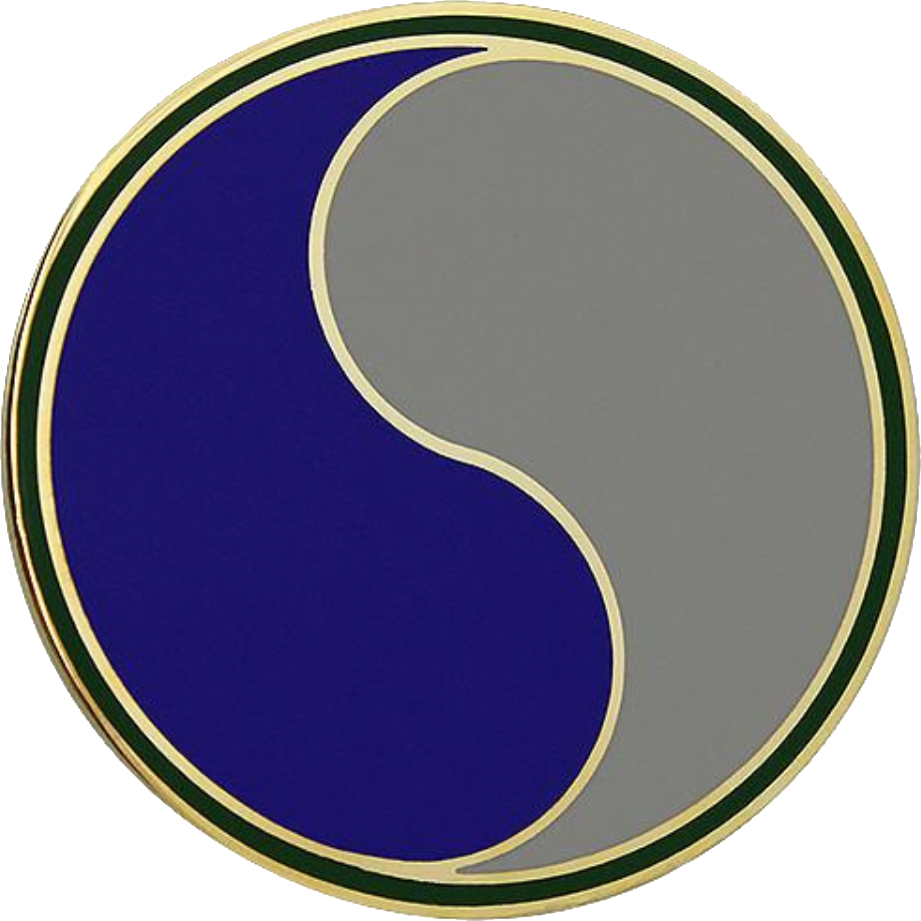
- Combat service identification badge

The 29th Infantry Division (29th ID), also known as the "Blue and Gray Division", is an infantry division of the United States Army based at Fort Belvoir in Fairfax County, Virginia. The division is currently a formation of the Army National Guard and includes units from Virginia, Maryland, Kentucky, North Carolina, South Carolina, and West Virginia.

Formed in 1917, the division deployed to France as a part of the American Expeditionary Force during World War I. It was called up for service again during World War II. The division's 116th Regiment, attached to the 1st Infantry Division, was the first wave of troops ashore during the Normandy landings in France (Operation Overlord). It supported a special Ranger unit tasked with clearing strong points at Omaha Beach. The rest of the 29th ID came ashore later, then advanced to Saint-Lô, and eventually through France and into Germany.

Following the end of World War II, the division saw frequent reorganizations (especially Pentomic), and was then inactivated in 1968. It was reformed in 1985, taking part in numerous training exercises. Then in the 1990s it made peacekeeping deployments to Bosnia and Herzegovina (SFOR10) and Kosovo (KFOR) as command elements. Units of the division deployed to Guantanamo Bay Naval Base, Cuba. Then parts of the division fought in the War in Afghanistan; and in the Iraq War as a part of Operation Iraqi Freedom and Operation New Dawn.

After the initial US withdrawal from Iraq in 2010, it again sent forces to the Middle East for Operation Spartan Shield. In 2016, two separate elements of the 29th deployed overseas. In July 2016, over 80 soldiers deployed in support of Operation Inherent Resolve, a U.S. government military campaign against Islamic State militants.

In October 2019, over 450 soldiers from the division deployed for Operation Spartan Shield.

The division most recently deployed to Kuwait for its second Task Force Spartan rotation in 2021. From Kuwait, staff officers from 29ID Headquarters and Headquarters Battalion coordinated the rescue of approximately 11,000 refugees from Afghanistan following the Taliban takeover of the state.

== History ==
=== World War I ===
The 29th Division was constituted on paper on 18 July 1917, three months after the American entry into World War I, in the National Guard. Troops came from Delaware, Maryland, New Jersey, Virginia, and Washington, D.C. As the division was composed of men from states that had units that fought for both the North and South during the American Civil War, it was nicknamed the "Blue and Gray" division, after the blue uniforms of the Union and the gray uniforms of the Confederate armies. The division was organized as a unit on 25 August 1917 at Camp McClellan, Alabama. In November, 1,000 draftees from Delaware, Maryland, New Jersey, and the District of Columbia joined the division, while in January 1918, the 1st Delaware Infantry was relieved from assignment to the division and used to form the separate 59th Pioneer Infantry Regiment. In May, remaining vacancies were filled by 5,000 more draftees from New York, New England, and the Midwest.

The division, commanded throughout its existence by Major General Charles G. Morton, departed for the Western Front in June 1918 to join the American Expeditionary Forces (AEF). The division's advance detachment reached Brest, France on 8 June. In late September, the 29th received orders to join the U.S. First Army's Meuse–Argonne offensive as part of the French XVII Corps.

During its 21 days in combat, the 29th Division advanced seven kilometers, captured 2,148 prisoners, and knocked out over 250 machine guns or artillery pieces. Thirty percent of the division were casualties in the war, including 170 officers and 5,691 enlisted men were killed or wounded. Shortly thereafter the Armistice with Germany was signed on 11 November 1918, ending hostilities between the Central Powers and the Allied Powers. The division returned to the United States in May 1919. It demobilized on 30 May at Camp Dix, New Jersey,

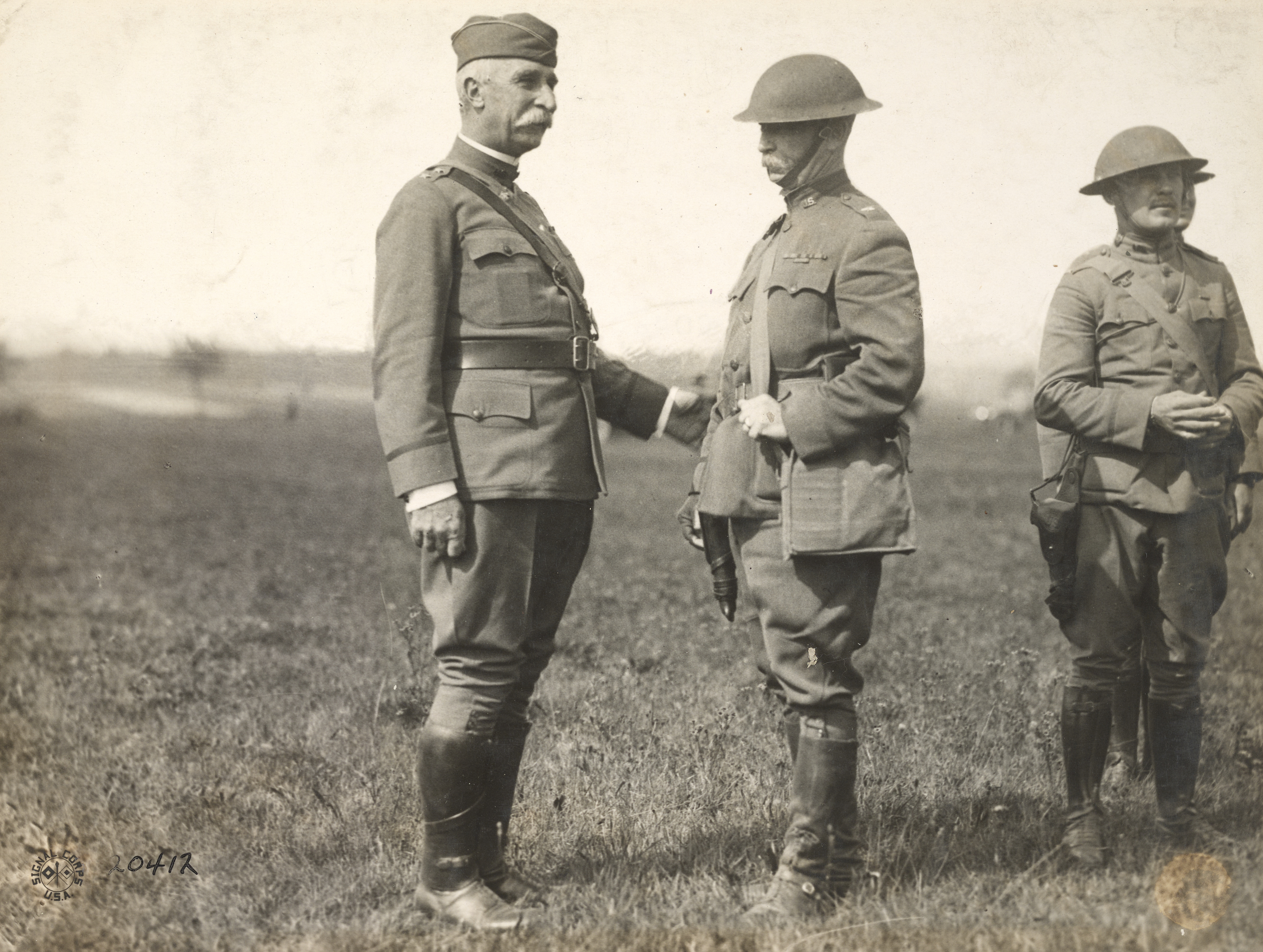
Major General Charles G. Morton and Brigadier General Harry H. Bandholtz at a review in Alsace, France, 1918

==== Order of battle, 1917–1918 ====
- Headquarters, 29th Division
- 57th Infantry Brigade (now 57th Troop Command, NJ ARNG)
  - 113th Infantry Regiment (former 4th New Jersey Infantry less Headquarters Company, Machine Gun Company, Company L, and part of Supply Company, 1st New Jersey Infantry less Company K, and 2nd New Jersey Infantry less band, Machine Gun Company, and Companies G and L)
  - 114th Infantry Regiment (former 3rd New Jersey Infantry less band, Machine Gun Company, and Companies I and L, and 5th New Jersey Infantry less Company F)
  - 111th Machine Gun Battalion (former Machine Gun Company, 4th New Jersey Infantry, and Machine Gun Company and Company L, 2nd New Jersey Infantry)
- 58th Infantry Brigade
  - 115th Infantry Regiment (former 1st Maryland Infantry less Company H, 5th Maryland Infantry less Headquarters, Supply, and Machine Gun Companies, and 4th Maryland Infantry less band, Machine Gun Company, and Companies A, B, D, E, F, H, and I)
  - 116th Infantry Regiment (former 2nd Virginia Infantry, 1st Virginia Infantry less band) and Machine Gun Company, and 4th Virginia Infantry less Headquarters Company, Machine Gun Company, and Companies D, I, and M)
  - 112th Machine Gun Battalion (former Company H, 1st Maryland Infantry, Machine Gun Company, 4th Maryland Infantry, and Machine Gun Company and Company D, 4th Virginia Infantry)
- 54th Field Artillery Brigade
  - 110th Field Artillery Regiment (75 mm) (former Headquarters and Supply Companies, 5th Maryland Infantry, Batteries A, B and C, Maryland Field Artillery, Batteries A and B, D.C. Field Artillery, 1st Squadron, D.C. Cavalry, and detachment from Company A, Virginia Signal Corps)
  - 111th Field Artillery Regiment (75 mm) (former 1st Virginia Field Artillery, Headquarters Company and Companies I and M, 4th Virginia Infantry, and detachment from Company A, Virginia Signal Corps)
  - 112th Field Artillery Regiment (155 mm) (former 1st New Jersey Field Artillery less Battery F, Troops B and D, 1st New Jersey Cavalry, and detachment from Company A, Virginia Signal Corps)
  - 104th Trench Mortar Battery (former Battery F, New Jersey Field Artillery)
- 110th Machine Gun Battalion (former Machine Gun Company, 5th Maryland Infantry, Machine Gun Company, 4th New Jersey Infantry, and Machine Gun Company, 1st Virginia Infantry)
- 104th Engineer Regiment (former 1st Battalion. New Jersey Engineers, Company K, 1st New Jersey Infantry, Company G, 2nd New Jersey Infantry, Companies I and L, 3rd New Jersey Infantry, Co. L, 4th New Jersey Infantry, and Co. F, 5th New Jersey Infantry)
- 104th Field Signal Battalion (former Companies A and C, New Jersey Signal Corps, and Company B, D.C. Signal Corps)
- Headquarters Troop, 29th Division (detachment from 1st Squadron, New Jersey Cavalry)
- 104th Train Headquarters and Military Police (former Troops A and C, 1st Squadron New Jersey Cavalry, and Troop A, Maryland Cavalry)
  - 104th Ammunition Train (former 1st Squadron, Virginia Cavalry, and individual transfers)
  - 104th Supply Train (individual transfers)
  - 104th Engineer Train (individual transfers)
  - 104th Sanitary Train
    - 113th, 114th, 115th, and 116th Ambulance Companies and Field Hospitals (former 1st Maryland Ambulance Company, 1st Virginia Ambulance Company, 1st New Jersey Field Hospital, 1st Maryland Field Hospital, and 1st Virginia Field Hospital)

=== Interwar period ===
In accordance with the National Defense Act of 1920, the division was allotted to the states of Maryland, Virginia, and the District of Columbia, and assigned to the III Corps in 1921. The division headquarters was reorganized and federally recognized on 31 July 1923 at Washington, D.C. The designated mobilization training center for the "Blue and Gray" Division was Fort Eustis, Virginia. Units from New Jersey that were part of the 29th Division in World War I were assigned to the new 44th Division, which encompassed troops from New Jersey and New York. As a result, the 57th Infantry Brigade and 104th Engineer Regiment went to the 44th Division, while the newly constituted 91st Infantry Brigade and 121st Engineer Regiment were assigned the 29th Division. When 155 mm howitzers were returned to infantry divisions beginning in 1929, a formerly non-divisional unit from Pennsylvania was assigned to the division.

From 1922 to 1936, the division's subordinate units held separate summer camps at locations within their respective states: Camp Albert C. Ritchie, near Cascade, Maryland, for Maryland and District of Columbia units, the Virginia Beach State Military Reservation at Virginia Beach, Virginia, for Virginia units, and the target range in Monroe and Wayne Counties, Pennsylvania, near Tobyhanna, for the artillery units. The division staff, composed of personnel from all four states, came together to conduct joint training most summers before World War II. The division staff's summer training periods were conducted most years at Camp Ritchie, Virginia Beach, or Fort George G. Meade, Maryland. The headquarters also participated in several corps area and army-level command post exercises (CPXs) during the interwar years. However, the first time the majority of the division's subordinate units had the chance to operate together came in June 1935 during the portion of the First Army maneuvers held at Indiantown Gap Military Reservation, Pennsylvania.

Unfortunately, the 91st Infantry Brigade and the 121st Engineers did not attend the maneuver. The poliomyelitis epidemic which had developed in Virginia that summer prompted the governor of Pennsylvania to refuse the brigade's entry into the state. The next opportunity to train as one unit came in August 1939 when the entire division was assembled at Manassas, Virginia, for the Third Corps Area concentration of the First Army maneuvers. In that maneuver, the "Blue and Gray" Division operated as part of the provisional III Corps. For the additional week's training directed by the War Department for all National Guard units that winter, the Virginia elements of the 29th Division assembled 12–18 November 1939 at Virginia Beach, while the Maryland and District of Columbia elements assembled at Camp Ritchie. The final division training event before induction came in August 1940 when the 29th Division participated in the First Army maneuvers near Canton, New York. The division again operated as part of the III Corps against the provisional I Corps. The division was relieved from the III Corps on 30 December 1940 and assigned to the II Corps. It was inducted into federal service at home stations on 3 February 1941. Instead of Fort Eustis, however, it was ordered to move to Fort George G. Meade, where it arrived on 4-5 February 1941. The division was transferred to the A.P. Hill Military Reservation, Virginia, on 14 September 1941. After the division’s initial train-up period, it participated in the Carolina Maneuvers in October–November 1941 as part of the II Corps in the vicinity of Hoffman-Oakboro, North Carolina. Location of the division headquarters on 7 December 1941 was in transit between North Carolina and Fort George G. Meade.

==== Commanders ====
- Major General Anton Stephan (Washington, D.C.), 31 July 1923 – 10 April 1934
- Major General Milton A. Reckord (Maryland), 14 April 1934–February 1942

=== World War II ===
==== WWII division organization ====
===== Square division =====
On 3 February 1941, the 29th Division was inducted into federal service at home stations and then assembled at Fort Meade in Maryland. At the time the division still retained its World War I square organization and consisted of the following units.

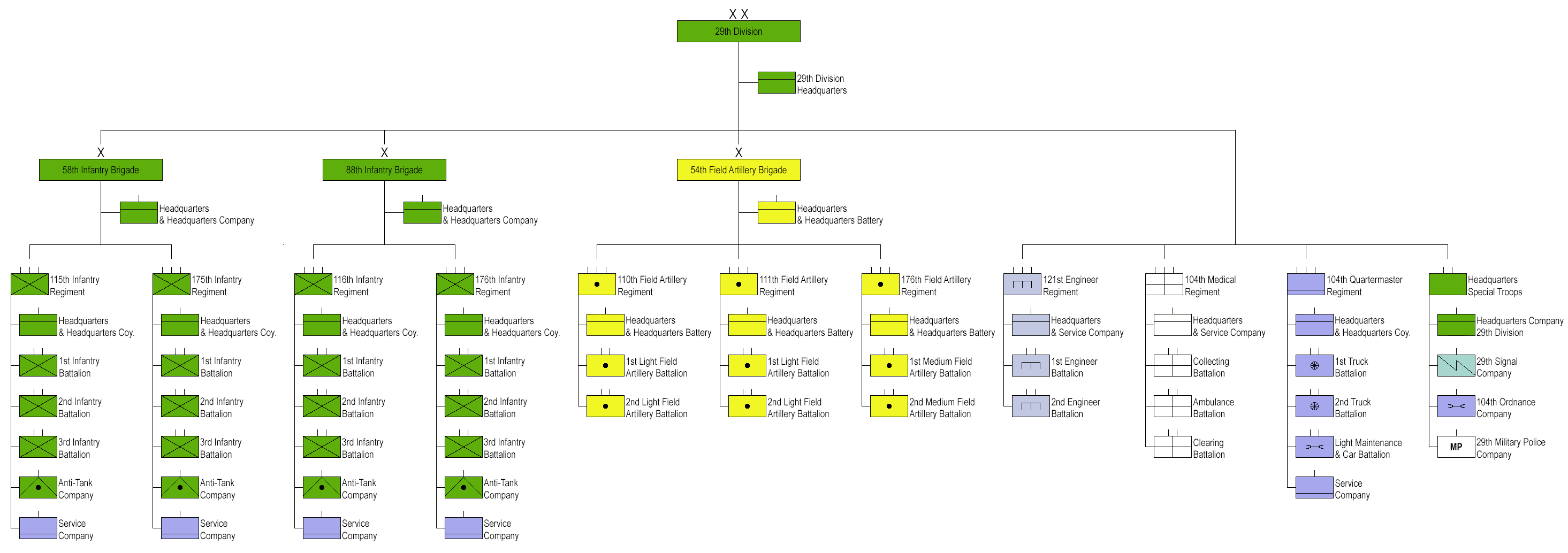
29th Division square organization (click to enlarge)

- 29th Division, in Washington, D.C.
  - 29th Division Headquarters, in Washington, D.C.
  - 58th Infantry Brigade, in Baltimore (MD)
    - Headquarters and Headquarters Company, in Baltimore (MD)
    - 115th Infantry Regiment, in Frederick (MD)
      - Headquarters and Headquarters Company
      - 3× Infantry battalions
        - each battalion consists of: 1× Headquarters and Headquarters Detachment, 3× Rifle companies, 1× Weapons Company
      - Anti-Tank Company (M3 37mm Anti-Tank guns)
      - Service Company
    - 175th Infantry Regiment, in Baltimore (MD)
      - same organization as 115th Infantry Regiment
  - 88th Infantry Brigade, in Richmond (VA)
    - Headquarters and Headquarters Company, in Berryville (VA)
    - 116th Infantry Regiment, in Lynchburg (VA)
      - same organization as 115th Infantry Regiment
    - 176th Infantry Regiment, in Richmond (VA)
      - same organization as 115th Infantry Regiment
  - 54th Field Artillery Brigade, in Norfolk (VA)
    - Headquarters and Headquarters Battery, in Richmond (VA)
    - 110th Field Artillery Regiment, in Pikesville (MD)
      - Headquarters and Headquarters Battery
      - 2× Light Field Artillery battalions
        - Headquarters and Headquarters Battery
        - 3× Howitzer batteries (M1897 75mm field guns), replaced by M2 105mm towed howitzers in 1941)
        - Service Battery
    - 111th Field Artillery Regiment, in Hampton (VA)
      - same organization as 110th Field Artillery Regiment
    - 176th Field Artillery Regiment, in Pittsburgh (PA)
      - Headquarters and Headquarters Battery
      - 2× Medium Field Artillery battalions
        - Headquarters and Headquarters Battery
        - 3× Howitzer batteries (M1918 155mm towed howitzers, replaced by M1 155mm towed howitzers in 1941)
        - Anti-Tank Battery (M1897 75mm anti-tank guns)
        - Service Battery
  - 121st Engineer Regiment, in Washington, D.C.
    - Headquarters and Headquarters and Service Company
    - 2× Engineer battalions
      - each battalion consists of: 1× Headquarters, 3× Engineer companies
  - 104th Medical Regiment, in Baltimore (MD)
    - Headquarters and Headquarters and Service Company
    - Collecting Battalion
      - battalion consists of: 1× Headquarters, 3× Collecting companies
    - Ambulance Battalion
      - battalion consists of: 1× Headquarters, 3× Ambulance companies
    - Clearing Battalion
      - battalion consists of: 1× Headquarters, 3× Clearing companies
  - 104th Quartermaster Regiment, in Baltimore (MD)
    - Headquarters and Headquarters Company
    - 2× Truck battalions
      - each battalion consists of: 1× Headquarters, 2× Truck companies
    - Light Maintenance and Car Battalion
      - battalion consists of: 1× Headquarters, 1× Light Maintenance Company, 1× Car Company
    - Service Company
  - Headquarters, Special Troops, in Washington, D.C.
    - Headquarters Company, 29th Division, in Washington, D.C.
    - 29th Signal Company, in Norfolk (VA)
    - 104th Ordnance Company, in Washington, D.C.
    - 29th Military Police Company, in Washington, D.C.

===== Triangular division =====
On 12 March 1942, as a part of an Army-wide reorganization of National Guard divisions, the 29th Division was reorganized as a triangular division. The division's two brigade headquarters were disbanded in favor of a structure containing three separate regimental commands reporting directly to the division headquarters, as well as four field artillery battalions under a division artillery headquarters, with the engineer, medical, and quartermaster regiments also reduced to battalions. The 176th Infantry Regiment was transferred to the General Headquarters, United States Army and tasked with guarding government buildings in Washington, D.C. With the reorganization the division was renamed 29th Infantry Division. Afterwards the 29th Infantry Division was composed of the following units:

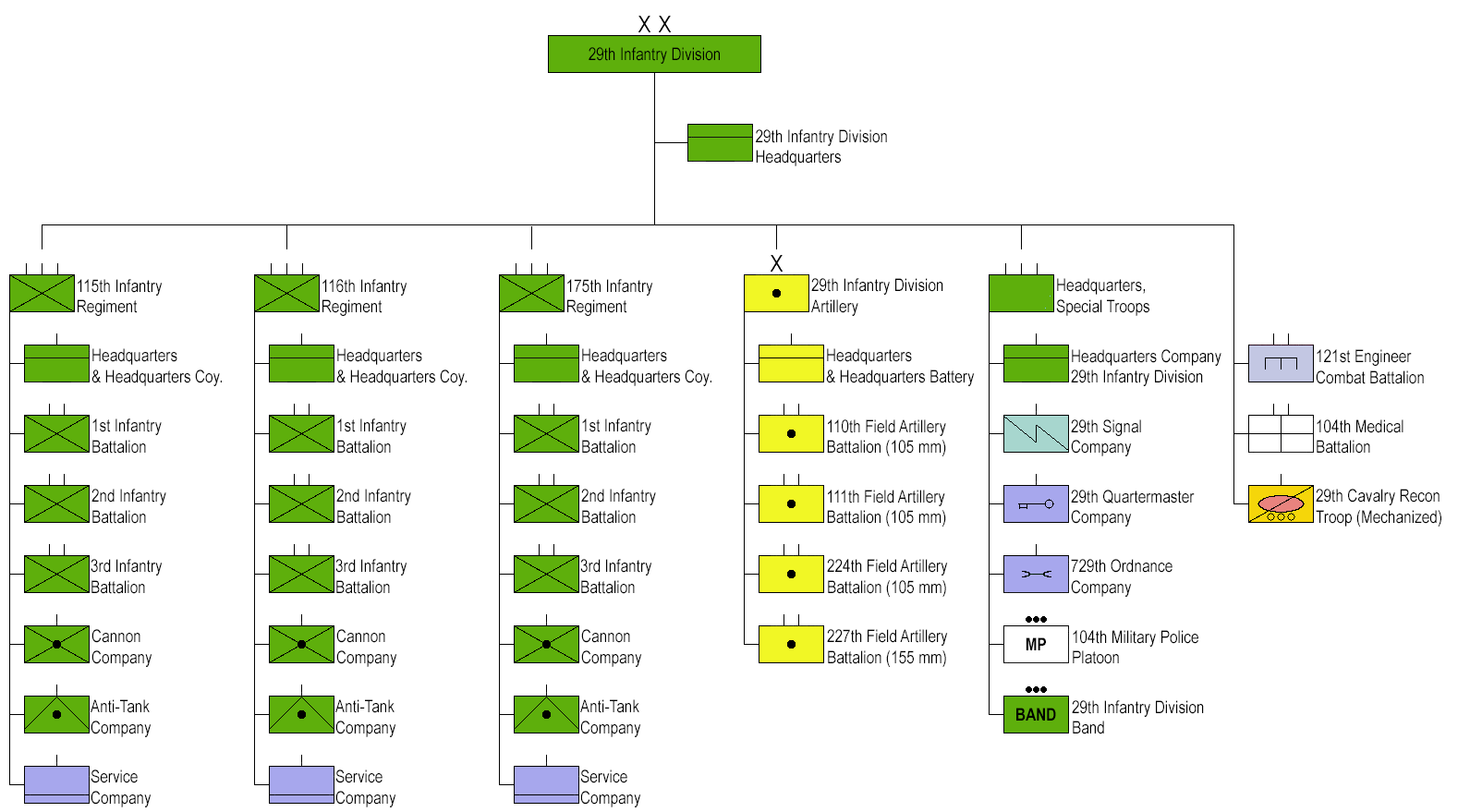
29th Infantry Division triangular organization (click to enlarge)

- 29th Infantry Division
  - 29th Infantry Division Headquarters
  - 29th Cavalry Reconnaissance Troop (Mechanized) (M3 scout cars and then M8 Greyhound armored cars)
  - 115th Infantry Regiment
    - Headquarters and Headquarters Company
    - 3× Infantry battalions
      - each battalion consists of: 1× Headquarters and Headquarters Company, 3× Rifle companies, 1× Heavy Weapons Company
    - Cannon Company (T12 Gun Motor Carriages and T19 Howitzer Motor Carriages, later replaced by either M3 105mm towed howitzers or M7 Priest self propelled howitzers)
    - Anti-Tank Company (M3 37mm anti-tank guns, which were replaced by 1944 with M1 57mm anti-tank guns)
    - Service Company
  - 116th Infantry Regiment
    - same organization as 115th Infantry Regiment
  - 175th Infantry Regiment
    - same organization as 115th Infantry Regiment
  - 29th Infantry Division Artillery
    - Headquarters and Headquarters Battery
    - 110th Field Artillery Battalion
      - Headquarters and Headquarters Battery
      - 3× Batteries (M2 105mm towed howitzers)
      - Service Battery
    - 111th Field Artillery Battalion
      - same organization as 110th Field Artillery Battalion
    - 224th Field Artillery Battalion
      - same organization as 110th Field Artillery Battalion
    - 227th Field Artillery Battalion
      - Headquarters and Headquarters Battery
      - 3× Batteries (M1 155mm towed howitzers)
      - Service Battery
  - Headquarters Special Troops
    - Headquarters Company, 29th Infantry Division
    - 29th Signal Company
    - 29th Quartermaster Company
    - 729th Ordnance Light Maintenance Company
    - 104th Military Police Platoon
    - 29th Infantry Division Band (attached)
  - 29th Quartermaster Battalion (Between September and November 1942 Quartermaster battalions were disbanded and their platoons used to form a Quartermaster Company and an Ordnance Company, which were both assigned to Headquarters Special Troops)
    - Headquarters and Headquarters Company (includes a service platoon and a maintenance platoon)
    - Truck Company
  - 121st Engineer Combat Battalion
    - Headquarters and Headquarters and Service Company
    - 3× Engineer combat companies
  - 104th Medical Battalion
    - Headquarters and Headquarters Detachment
    - 3× Collecting companies
    - Clearing Company

==== England ====
In May 1942, the 37th Infantry Division had been alerted for movement to England, and sent its 112th Engineer Combat Battalion ahead as part of the advance party. Orders were changed, and the 37th was diverted for service in the Pacific Theater. There was no time to recall the 112th, or to find and assign a new battalion. The War Department instead ordered the 121st Engineer Combat Battalion, less five officers and 120 men, moved from Fort Meade to Fort Indiantown Gap, and the unit was redesignated the 117th Engineer Combat Battalion and assigned to the 37th Infantry Division. Around the cadre of five officers and 120 men, in addition to Selective Service fillers sent from Fort Hayes, Ohio, and Fort Devens, Massachusetts, a new 121st Engineer Combat Battalion was organized.

The 29th Infantry Division, under the command of Major General Leonard Gerow, was sent to England on 5 October 1942 on RMS Queen Mary. It was based throughout England and Scotland, where it immediately began training for an invasion of northern France across the English Channel. In May 1943 the division moved to the Devon–Cornwall peninsula and started conducting simulated attacks against fortified positions. At this time the division was assigned to V Corps of the U.S. First Army. In July the divisional commander, Major General Gerow, was promoted to command V Corps and Major General Charles Hunter Gerhardt assumed command of the division, remaining in this post for the rest of the war.

==== Normandy ====
D-Day of Operation Neptune, the cross-channel invasion of Normandy, finally came on 6 June 1944. Neptune was the assault phase of the larger Operation Overlord, codename for the Allied campaign to liberate France from the Germans. The 29th Infantry Division sent the 116th Infantry to support the western flank of the veteran 1st Infantry Division's 16th Infantry at Omaha Beach.

Omaha was known to be the most difficult of the five landing beaches, due to its rough terrain and bluffs overlooking the beach, which had been well fortified by its German defenders of the 352nd Infantry Division. The 116th Infantry was assigned four sectors of the beach; Easy Green, Dog Red, Dog White, and Dog Green. Soldiers of the 29th Infantry Division boarded a large number of attack transports for the D-Day invasion, among them landing craft, landing ship, tank, and landing ship, infantry ships and other vessels such as the SS Empire Javelin, USS Charles Carroll, and USS Buncombe County.

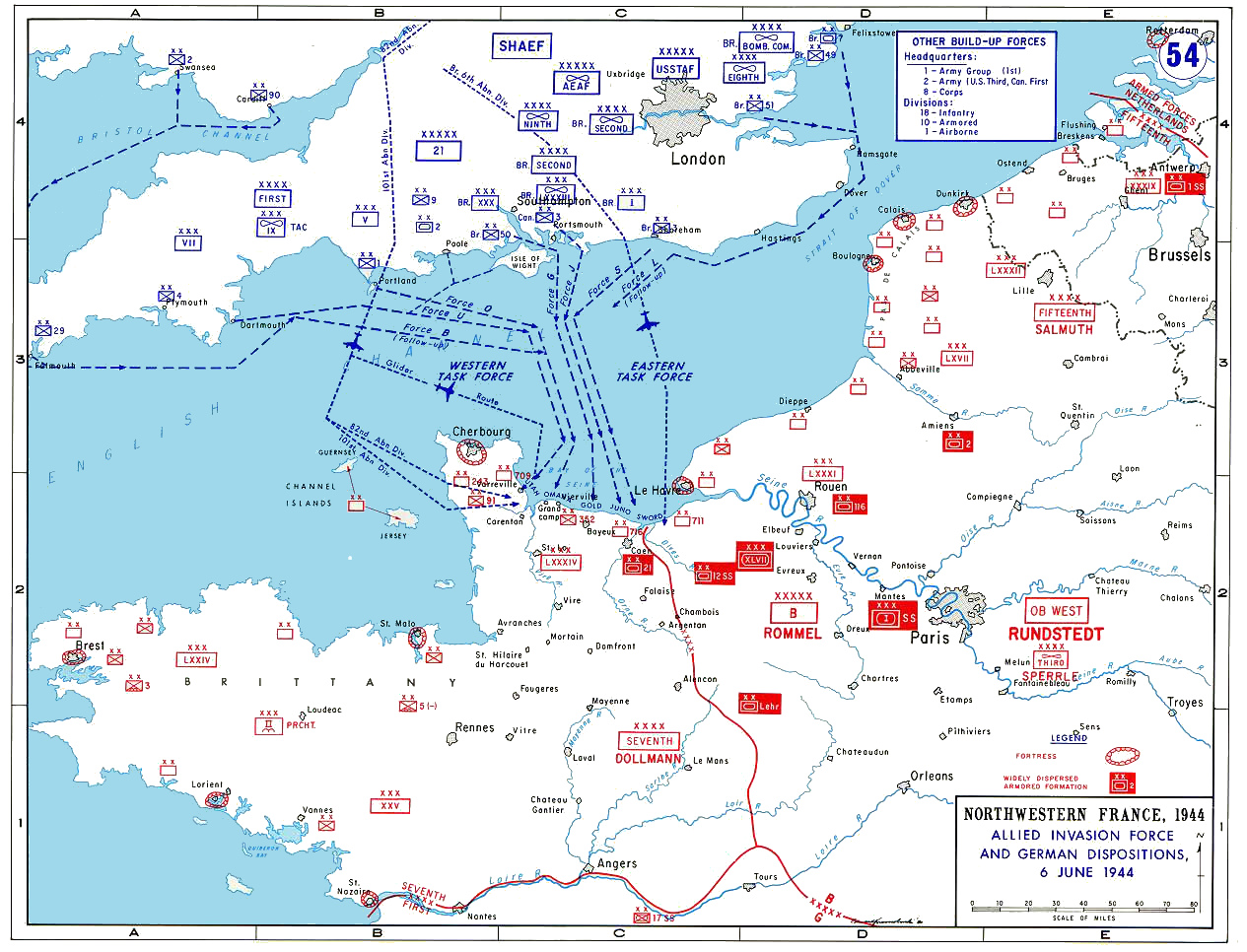
Allied battle plan for Operation Overlord, the Allied invasion of Normandy.

As the ships were traveling to the beach, the heavy seas, combined with the chaos of the fighting caused most of the landing force to be thrown off-course and most of the 116th Infantry missed its landing spots. Most of the regiment's tank support, launched from too far off-shore, foundered and sank in the channel. The soldiers of the 116th Infantry were the first to hit the beach at 0630, coming under heavy fire from German fortifications. Company A, from the Virginia National Guard in Bedford, was annihilated by overwhelming fire as it landed on the 116th's westernmost section of the beach, along with half of Company A, B, and C of the 2nd Ranger Battalion and the 5th Rangers Battalion which was landing to the west of the 116th. The catastrophic losses suffered by this small Virginia community led to it being selected for the site of the National D-Day Memorial. The 1st Infantry Division's forces ran into similar fortifications on the eastern half of the beach, suffering massive casualties coming ashore. By 0830, the landings were called off for lack of space on the beach, as the Americans on Omaha Beach were unable to overcome German fortifications guarding the beach exits.

Lieutenant General Omar Bradley, commanding the American First Army, considered evacuating the survivors and landing the rest of the divisions elsewhere. However, by noon, elements of the American forces had been able to organize and advance off the beach, and the landings resumed. By nightfall, the division headquarters landed on the beach with about 60 percent of the division's total strength and began organizing the push inland. On 7 June, a second wave of 20,000 reinforcements from both the 1st and 29th Divisions was sent ashore. By the end of D-Day, 2,400 men from the two divisions had become casualties on Omaha Beach. Added to casualties at other beaches and air-drops made the total casualties for the Normandy landings 6,500 Americans and 3,000 British and Canadians, lighter numbers than expected.

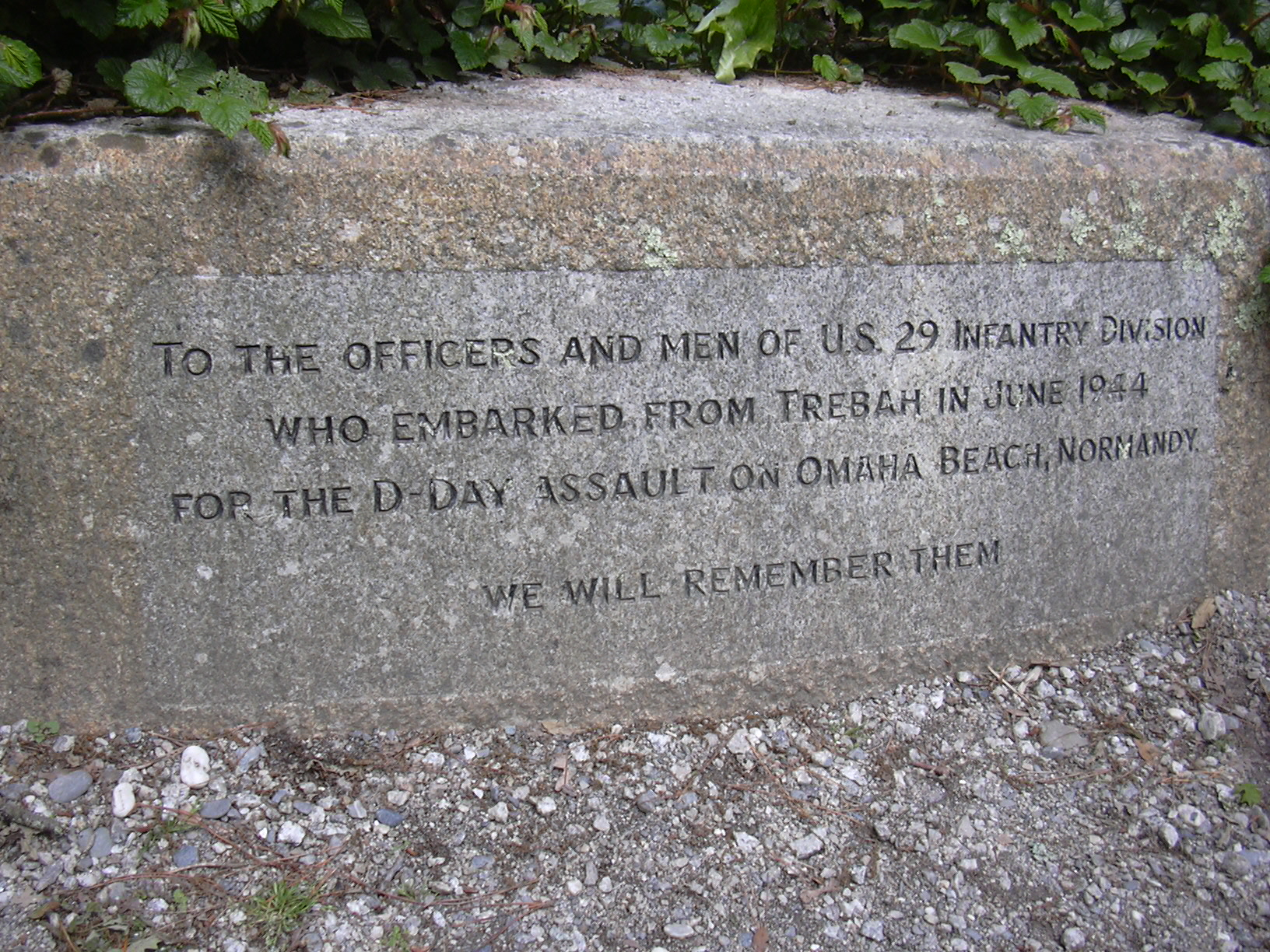
Memorial of the 29th Infantry Division's embarkation for D-Day in Trebah, United Kingdom.

The entire division had landed in Normandy by 7 June. By 9 June, Omaha Beach was secure and the division occupied Isigny. On 14 July, the division was reassigned to XIX Corps, part of the First Army, itself part of the 12th Army Group.

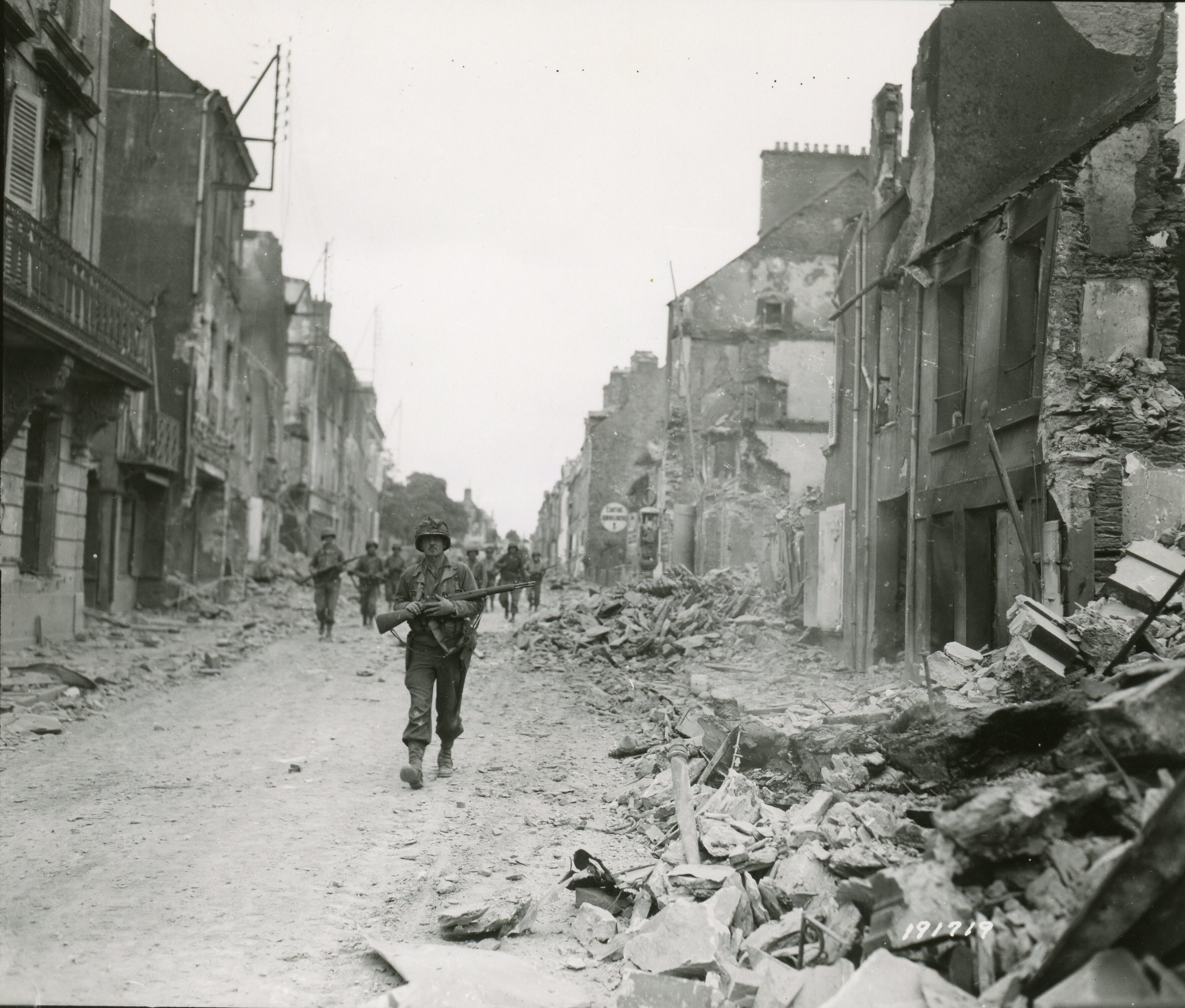
1st battalion, 115th Infantry entering St. Lô, France. July 20, 1944

The division cut across the Elle River and advanced slowly toward Saint-Lô, fighting bitterly in the Normandy hedgerow country. German reserves formed a new defensive front outside the town, and American forces fought a fierce battle with them two miles outside of the town. German forces used the dense bocage foliage to their advantage, mounting fierce resistance in house-to-house fighting in the ravaged Saint-Lô. By the end of the fight, the Germans were relying on artillery support to hold the town following the depletion of the infantry contingent. The 29th Division, which was already undermanned after heavy casualties on D-Day, was even further depleted in the intense fighting for Saint-Lô. Eventually, the 29th was able to capture the city in a direct assault, supported by airstrikes from P-47 Thunderbolts.

==== Brittany ====
After taking Saint-Lô, on 18 July, the division joined in the battle for Vire, capturing that strongly held city by 7 August. It continued to face stiff German resistance as it advanced to key positions southeast of Saint-Lô It was then reassigned to V Corps, and then again to VIII Corps. Turning west, the 29th took part in the assault on Brest which lasted from 25 August until 18 September.

==== Germany ====
After a short rest, the division returned to XIX Corps and took part in the Battle of Aachen by moving to defensive positions along the Teveren-Geilenkirchen line supporting the 30th Infantry Division in Germany and maintained those positions through October. On 16 November, the division began its drive to the Roer River, blasting its way through Siersdorf, Setterich, Durboslar, and Bettendorf, and reaching the Roer by the end of the month. Heavy fighting reduced in Jülich Sportplatz and the Hasenfeld Gut on 8 December. The Division did not take part in the Battle of the Bulge as they were held in reserve for equipment refitting and received replacements of fresh troops arriving from England and France after training for weeks.

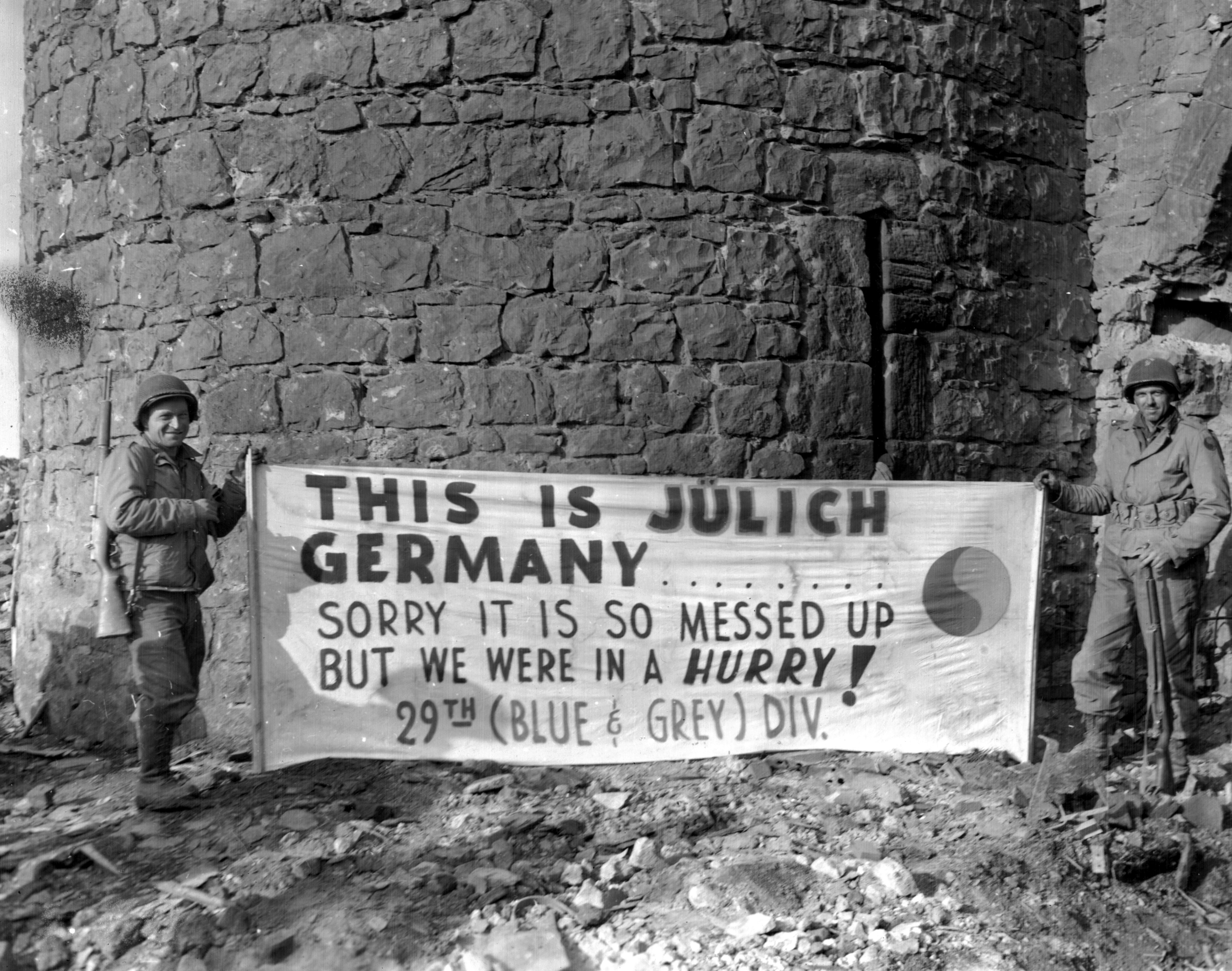
Soldiers of the 175th Infantry in Jülich, Germany, 24 February 1945.

From 8 December 1944 to 23 February 1945, the division was assigned to XIII Corps and held defensive positions along the Rur and prepared for the next major offensive, Operation Grenade. The division was reassigned to XIX Corps, and the attack jumped off across the Rur on 23 February and carried the division through Jülich, Broich, Immerath, and Titz, to Mönchengladbach by 1 March 1945. The division was out of combat in March. In early April the division was reassigned to XVI Corps, where the 116th Infantry helped mop up in the Ruhr Pocket. On 19 April 1945 the division, assigned to XIII Corps, pushed to the Elbe River and held defensive positions until 4 May and also made contact with Soviet troops. Meanwhile, the 175th Infantry cleared the Klotze Forest. After V-E Day, the division was on military occupation duty in the Bremen enclave. It was assigned to XVI Corps again for this assignment.

The division remained on occupation duty until the end of 1945. Camp Grohn near Bremen was the division headquarters until January 1946. The 29th Infantry Division returned to the United States in January 1946 and was demobilized and inactivated on 17 January 1946 at Camp Kilmer, New Jersey.

==== Casualties ====
- Total battle casualties: 20,620
- Killed in action: 3,887
- Wounded in action: 15,541
- Missing in action: 347
- Prisoner of war: 845

From July 1943, the 29th Infantry Division was commanded by Major General Charles H. Gerhardt. The division suffered the second-most battle casualties of any American division in the European Theater (after the 4th Infantry Division's 22,660). It was said facetiously that Gerhardt actually commanded three divisions: one on the field of battle, one in the hospital, and one in the cemetery. The 29th Infantry Division lost 3,887 men killed in action, 15,541 wounded in action (899 of whom died of their wounds), 347 missing in action (315 of whom were returned to military control alive), 845 prisoners of war (six of whom died in captivity), in addition to 8,665 non-combat casualties, during 242 days of combat. This amounted to over 200 percent of the division's normal strength. The division, in turn, took 38,912 German prisoners of war.

==== Decorations ====
Soldiers of the 29th Infantry Division were awarded five Medals of Honor, 44 Distinguished Service Crosses, one Distinguished Service Medal, 854 Silver Star Medals, 17 Legion of Merit Medals, 24 Soldier's Medals, 6,308 Bronze Star Medals, and 176 Air Medals during the conflict. The division itself was awarded four distinguished unit citations and four campaign streamers for the conflict.

=== Reactivation and Cold War ===
On 23 October 1946, the division was reactivated in Norfolk, Virginia as part of the National Guard. However, its subordinate elements were not fully manned and activated for several years.

In 1959, the division was reorganized under the Pentomic five battle group division organization. Ewing's 29th Infantry Division: A Short History of a Fighting Division says that several Maryland infantry and engineer companies were reorganized to form 1st Medium Tank Bn, 115th Armor; the 29th Aviation Company was established; and the 1st Reconnaissance Squadron, 183rd Armor, was established in Virginia as the division's reconnaissance squadron. In 1963, the division was reorganized in accordance with the Reorganization Objective Army Divisions plan, eliminating its regimental commands in favor of brigades. The 1st Brigade, 29th Infantry Division and 2nd Brigade, 29th Infantry Division were from the Virginia Army National Guard, and the 3rd Brigade, 29th Infantry Division from the Maryland Army National Guard.

Also in 1963, the division's Maryland component would be activated in Cambridge, Maryland due to the Cambridge movement. They would remain activated until 1964.

In 1968, in the middle of the Vietnam War, the Army inactivated several National Guard and Reserve divisions, including the 29th Infantry Division, to save money. During that time, the division's subordinate units were reassigned to other National Guard divisions. 1st Brigade was inactivated, while 2nd Brigade was redesignated as the 116th Infantry Brigade, and the 3rd Brigade was redesignated as 3rd Brigade, 28th Infantry Division.

On 6 June 1984, 40 years after the landings on Omaha Beach, Secretary of Defense Weinburger announced that the 29th Infantry Division, organized as a light infantry division, would be reactivated. On 30 September 1985, the division was reactivated at Fort Belvoir, Virginia, with units from the Virginia Army National Guard (VAARNG) and Maryland Army National Guard (MDARNG). The 116th Infantry Brigade was redesignated the 1st Brigade, 29th Division, while the 58th Infantry Brigade became the 3rd Brigade. That year, the division also received its distinctive unit insignia.

On 1 July 1986, the Aviation Brigade of the division was organized and federally recognized at Bel Air, Maryland.

=== Structure 1989 ===
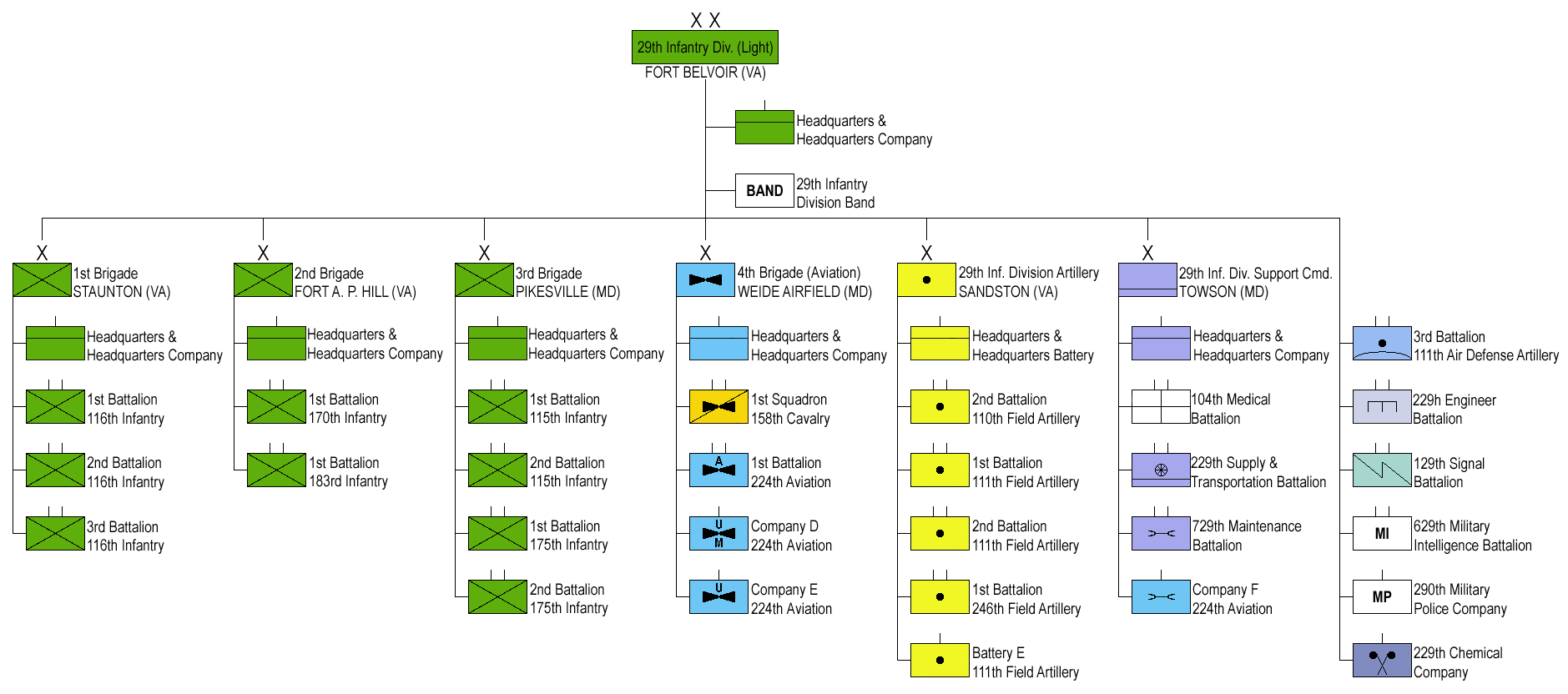
29th Infantry Division (Light) 1989 (click to enlarge)

At the end of the Cold War the division was a joint Virginia Army National Guard (VA ARNG) and Maryland Army National Guard (MD ARNG) formation. Virginia provided the division's headquarters, the 1st and 2nd Brigade, the Division Artillery (with one MD ARNG artillery battalion) and other minor units, while Maryland provided the 3rd Brigade, Aviation Brigade (with two VA ARNG aviation companies), the Division Support Command (with one VAARNG aviation company) and other minor units. The division was organized as follows:

- 29th Infantry Division (Light), Fort Belvoir (VA ARNG)
  - Headquarters and Headquarters Company, Fort Belvoir (VAARNG)
  - 1st Brigade, Staunton (VAARNG)
    - Headquarters and Headquarters Company, Staunton
    - 1st Battalion, 116th Infantry, Roanoke
    - 2nd Battalion, 116th Infantry, Lynchburg
    - 3rd Battalion, 116th Infantry, Winchester
  - 2nd Brigade, Fort A.P. Hill (VAARNG) (Would receive an additional infantry battalion from the 3rd Brigade during wartime)
    - Headquarters and Headquarters Company, Fort A.P. Hill
    - 1st Battalion, 170th Infantry, Alexandria
    - 1st Battalion, 183rd Infantry, Richmond
  - 3rd Brigade, Pikesville (MDARNG)
    - Headquarters and Headquarters Company
    - 1st Battalion, 115th Infantry, Silver Spring
    - 2nd Battalion, 115th Infantry, Chestertown
    - 1st Battalion, 175th Infantry, Baltimore
    - 2nd Battalion, 175th Infantry, Dundalk
  - Aviation Brigade, 29th Infantry Division, Weide Army Airfield (MDARNG)
    - Headquarters and Headquarters Company, Weide Army Airfield
    - 1st Squadron, 158th Cavalry, Annapolis (OH-58A Kiowa & AH-1E Cobra helicopters)
    - 1st Battalion, 224th Aviation (Attack), Weide Army Airfield (OH-58A Kiowa & AH-1E Cobra helicopters)
    - Company D, 224th Aviation (Assault), Sandston Army Airfield (VAARNG) (UH-60A Black Hawk helicopters)
    - Company E, 224th Aviation (General Support), Sandston Army Airfield (VAARNG) (UH-1H Iroquois helicopters)
  - 29th Infantry Division Artillery, Sandston (VAARNG)
    - Headquarters and Headquarters Battery, Sandston (formerly 224th Field Artillery Brigade VAARNG)
    - 2nd Battalion, 110th Field Artillery, Pikesville (MDARNG) (18 × M101 105 mm towed howitzers)
    - 1st Battalion, 111th Field Artillery, Norfolk (attached 18 × M198 155 mm towed howitzers unit)
    - 2nd Battalion, 111th Field Artillery, Richmond (18 × M101 105 mm towed howitzers)
    - 1st Battalion, 246th Field Artillery, Danville (18 × M101 105 mm towed howitzers)
    - Battery E, 111th Field Artillery, Emporia (8 × M198 155 mm towed howitzers)
  - 29th Infantry Division Support Command, Towson (MDARNG)
    - Headquarters and Headquarters Company, Towson
    - 104th Medical Battalion, Catonsville
    - 229th Supply & Transportation Battalion, Baltimore
    - 729th Maintenance Battalion, Havre de Grace
    - Company F, 224th Aviation (Aviation Intermediate Maintenance), Weide Army Airfield (VAARNG)
  - 3rd Battalion, 111th Air Defense Artillery, Portsmouth (VAARNG)
  - 229th Engineer Battalion, Fredericksburg (VAARNG)
  - 129th Signal Battalion, Bel Air (MDARNG)
  - 629th Military Intelligence Battalion, Greenbelt (MDARNG)
  - 29th Military Police Company, Pikesville (MDARNG)
  - 229th Chemical Company, Roanoke (VAARNG)
  - 29th Division Band, Roanoke (VAARNG)

=== The 1990s ===
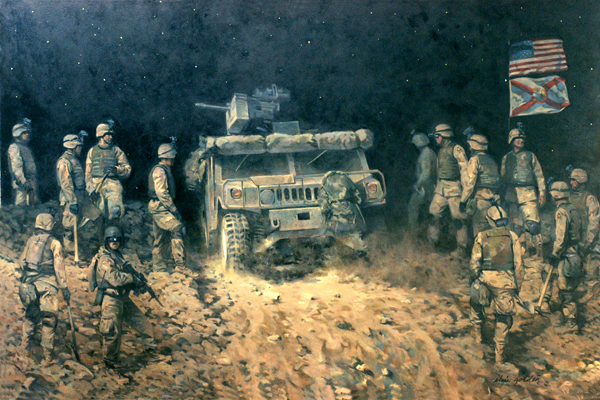
A 2005 oil painting depicting soldiers from the 2–124th participating in the 2003 invasion of Iraq

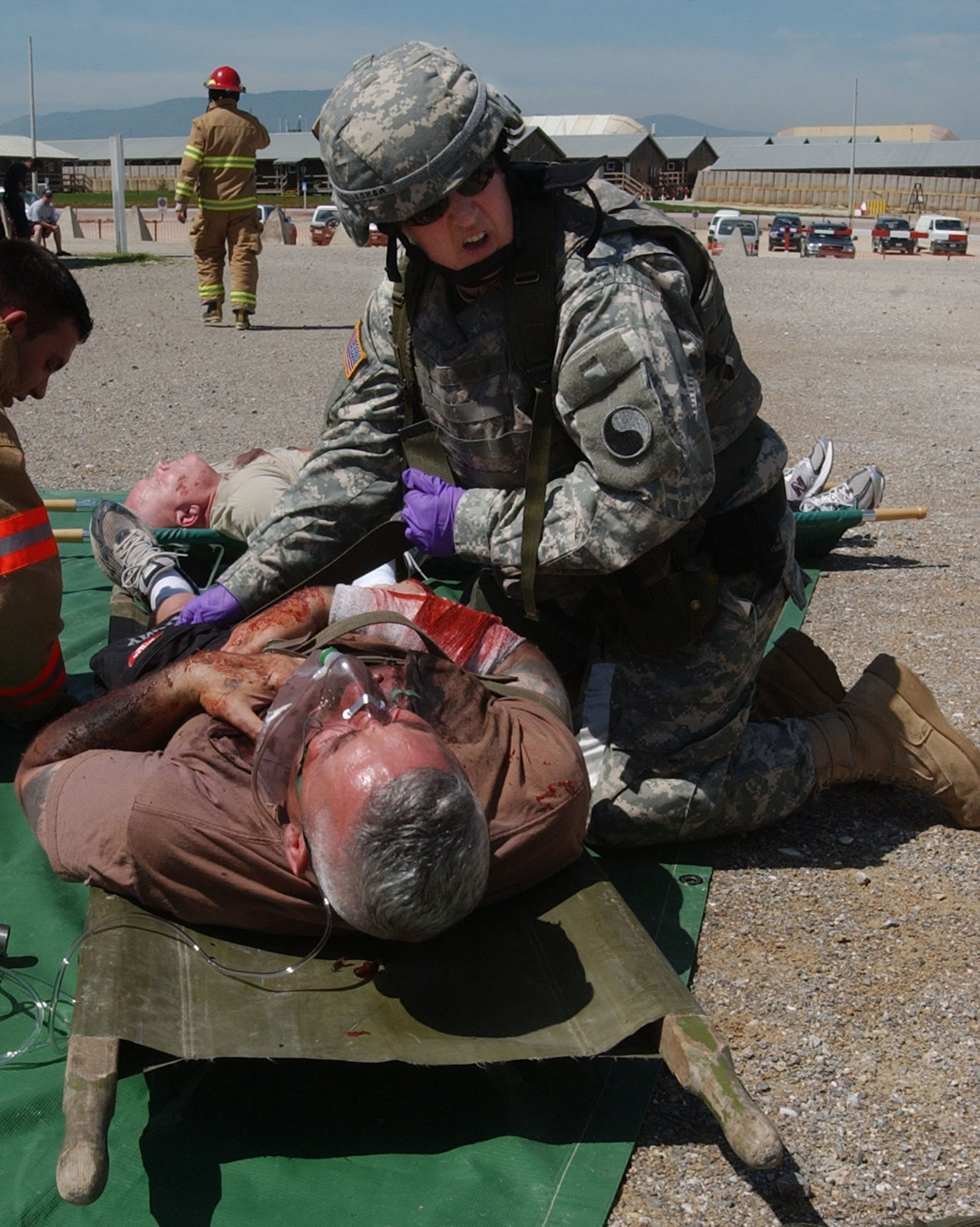
29th Infantry Division soldiers conduct a large-scale exercise at Camp Bondsteel in Kosovo in May 2009

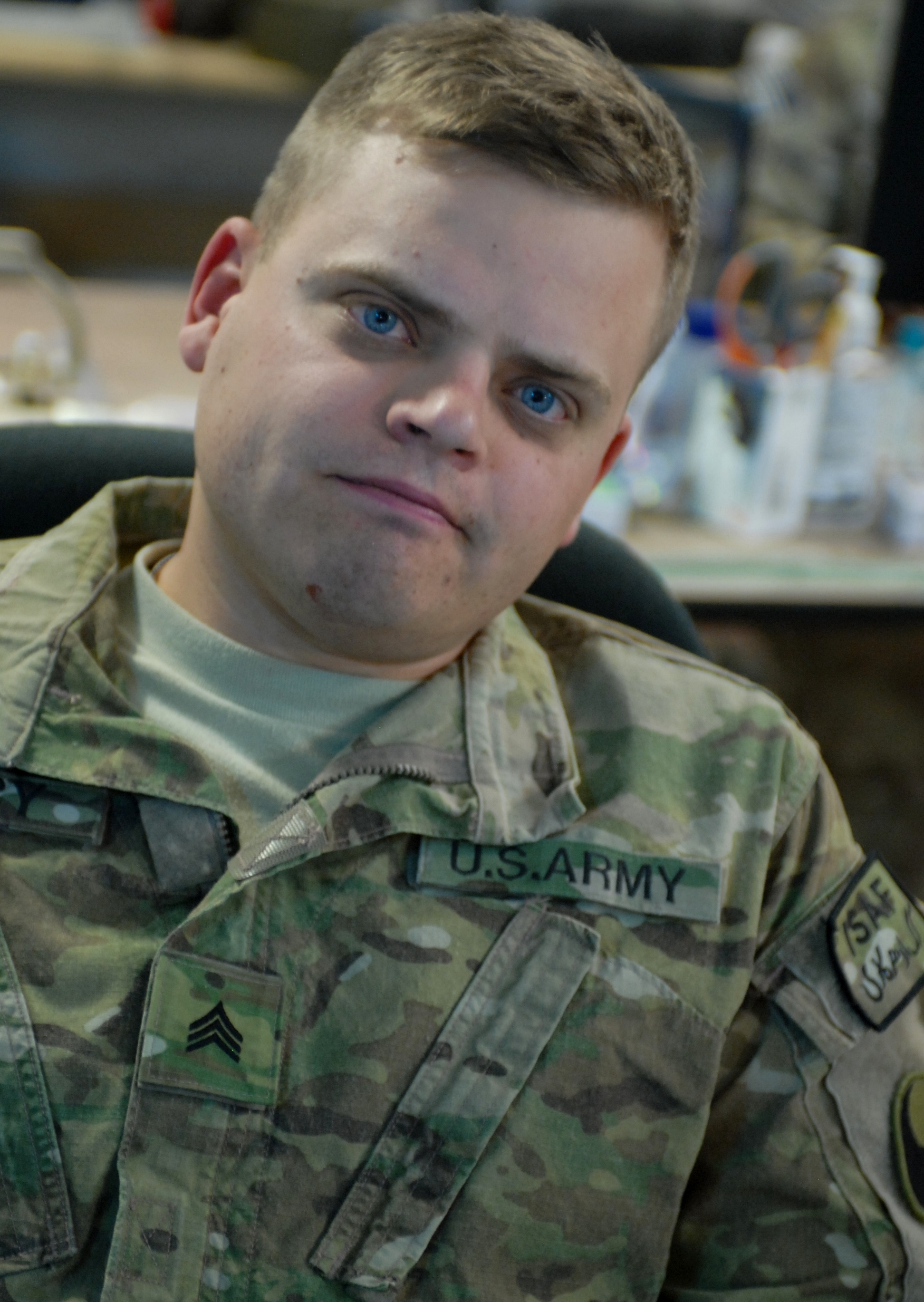
29th Infantry Division sergeant in Afghanistan as part of the International Security Assistance Force in 2011

At the end of the Cold War, the Army was reduced in size and budget. The 29th Infantry Division was retained, however 2nd Brigade was inactivated in favor of assets from the inactivating 26th Infantry Division, which was redesignated the 26th Brigade, 29th Infantry Division.

The largest National Guard training exercise ever held in Virginia took place in July 1998, bringing units from the 29th Infantry Division together for one large infantry exercise. The Division Maneuver Exercise, dubbed Operation Chindit, brought together Guard units from Virginia and Maryland, as well as Massachusetts, New Jersey, Connecticut and the District of Columbia. The exercise began with the heliborne insertion of troops from the 29th Infantry Division's 1st and 3rd Brigades by UH-60 Blackhawk. NATO allies joined the exercise. In December 2008, the division also dispatched a task force to Camp Asaka near Tokyo, Japan for exercises with the Japanese Ground Self Defense Force called Yama Sakura 55, a bilateral exercise simulating an invasion of Japan.

In March 1994, during a time of post-Cold War reductions in the size of the Regular Army, the 505th Parachute Infantry Regiment was tasked to test a new concept. The Regiment's task was to organize, train, certify, and deploy a multi-component battalion-sized task force made up of National Guard, Army Reserve and Regular Army soldiers to serve as the US Army's rotational Infantry Battalion for the Multi-National Force and Observers (MFO) in the Sinai Peninsula of Egypt. The soldiers selected for the unit reported to Fort Bragg in North Carolina in July 1994 to begin their training for the mission.

The task force was designated as the 4th Battalion, 505th Parachute Infantry Regiment, and carried the lineage of Company D, 505th Parachute Infantry Regiment, which had served throughout World War II and into the 1950s. Also known as Task Force 4-505 or "The Sinai Battalion", it was formally activated on 4 November 1994. The battalion was made up of 88% National Guardsmen and Army Reservists from 32 different states, and 12% Regular Army soldiers, most from the 82nd Airborne Division at Fort Bragg. Virginia and Maryland Army National Guardsmen from the 29th Infantry Division (Light) provided the largest contingent for the battalion. All of the National Guard and Army Reserve soldiers volunteered for a year of active duty in order to serve in the unit. After completing six months of peacekeeping training at Fort Bragg, the 4th Battalion, 505th Parachute Infantry Regiment deployed to the Sinai from January through June 1995, then redeployed to Fort Bragg. On 15 July 1995, the 4th Battalion was inactivated at Fort Bragg, and its soldiers returned to their parent units.

== Twenty-first century ==
Hundreds of soldiers from the 29th Infantry Division completed nine days of training on 16 June 2001 at Fort Polk, Louisiana, to prepare for their peacekeeping mission in Bosnia, as the second division headquarters to be deployed as a part of SFOR 10. In all, 2,085 National Guard soldiers from 16 states from Massachusetts to California served with the multinational force that operated in the US sector, MND-N. Their rotation began in October 2001 and lasted six months.

The 29th Infantry Division completed a two-week warfighter exercise at Fort Leavenworth, Kansas in late July 2003. Nearly 1,200 soldiers of the division participated in the training, which was overseen by First United States Army. Also engaged in the simulation war was about 150 soldiers of the New York Army National Guard's 42nd Infantry Division. The exercises covered a variety of operations, ranging from large-scale contingencies to airborne and civil affairs operations.

In March 2004, the 3rd Battalion 116th Infantry of 500+ soldiers was mobilized for 579 days to fight in Afghanistan. Following a 4-month train up, the battalion deployed to Bagram Air Base Afghanistan where the unit split into two operational elements. One element was stationed at Bagram where they were responsible for near-base security and the theater-north Quick Reaction Force. They executed 5, 10, and 20-kilometer ring patrols to increase force security and stayed ready to react at a moment's notice to deploy anywhere in Afghanistan to react to "troops in contact" that requested support. The other element moved south with the Bn Commander to control and shape operations in the Wardak and Ghazni provinces. Sergeant Bobby Beasley and Staff Sergeant Craig Cherry were killed in an IED attack on a patrol in southern Ghazni near Gilan, becoming the 116th Infantry's first casualties since World War II. Within the first three months, the unit would deploy nearly every soldier around Bagram, and throughout the Wardak and Ghazni provinces during the elections in which President Hamid Karzai was elected. The battalion returned home in July 2005, highly decorated for its efforts during its mission following hundreds of successful combat patrols and engagements.

In 2005, 350 veterans, politicians, and soldiers representing the division went to Normandy and Paris, in France for the 60th anniversary of the D-Day landings. The Army National Guard organized a major ceremony for the 60th anniversary, as many of the veterans who participated in the invasion were in their 80s at that time, and the 60th anniversary was seen as the last major anniversary of the landings in which a large number of veterans could take part.

The division underwent a major reorganization in 2006. A special troops battalion was added to the division's command structure, and its three brigades were redesignated. It as organized around three brigades; the 30th Heavy Brigade Combat Team of North Carolina, the 116th Infantry Brigade Combat Team of Virginia, and the Combat Aviation Brigade, 29th Infantry Division of Maryland. It lost the previously aligned 92nd Infantry Brigade in Puerto Rico.

In December 2006, the division took command of the Eastern region of Kosovo's peacekeeping force, to provide security in the region. The division's soldiers were part of a NATO multi-national task force consisting of units from Ukraine, Greece, Poland, Romania, Armenia and Lithuania under the command of U.S. Army Brigadier General Douglas B. Earhart who concurrently served as the 29th's Deputy Commanding General. The division returned to Fort Belvoir in November 2007.

After a three-month pre-deployment train-up at Mississippi's Camp Shelby, the 116th Infantry Brigade Combat Team deployed to Kuwait and Iraq in September 2007, as part of the Iraq War's Operation Iraqi Freedom, returning home in May 2008.

Approximately 72 Virginia and Maryland National Guard soldiers with the 29th ID were deployed to Afghanistan from December 2010 to October 2011. As part of the 29th ID Security Partnering Team, the Soldiers were assigned to NATO's International Security Assistance Force Joint Command Security Partnering Team with the mission of assisting with the growth and development of the Afghan National Security Forces where they served as advisers and mentors to senior Afghan leaders. They were part of a NATO Coalition of 49 troop-contributing nations that Security Partnering personnel interacted with daily across Afghanistan.

They were replaced in November 2011 by a new team from the 29th Infantry Division. A team of 65 29th ID soldiers served in Afghanistan as a Security Partnering Team until July 2012.

The 29th ID suffered one casualty during this deployment. Maj. Robert Marchanti of the Maryland Army National Guard was killed on 25 February 2012.

In 2014 the 29th ID twice sent soldiers to the Joint Multinational Readiness Center in Hohenfels, Germany to assist in the training of U.S. and multinational soldiers preparing to head to Kosovo as part of the Kosovo Force mission. The 29th ID soldiers performed as the KFOR staff, serving as subject matter experts, enforcing KFOR orders, systems and procedures, and working with JMRC to help the deploying troops achieve their training objectives.

The 29th ID currently serves as the Domestic All-Hazards Response Team (DART) in FEMA Regions 1 through 5 (states east of the Mississippi). In this role, the 29th ID is prepared to assist the state National Guard in their service to governors and citizens during an incident response. The DART provides defense support of civil authority capabilities in response to a catastrophic event. The DART conducts joint reception, staging, onward movement and Integration of inbound OPCON forces and establishes base support installations and /or forward operating bases for sustaining operations.

On 24 July 2015, Brig. Gen. Blake C. Ortner took command of the 29th Infantry Division from Maj. Gen. Charles W. Whittington.

On 19 December 2016, the 29th Infantry Division assumed command of U.S. Army Central's intermediate division headquarters, Task Force Spartan, at Camp Arifjan, Kuwait. This deployment includes 450 Virginia, Maryland and North Carolina Army National Guard soldiers and is the first time the 29th Infantry Division has been a part of the Third Army since 1944, during WWII.

More than 80 members of the 29th deployed to Jordan in August 2016 where they assumed command of the military's joint operations center there to support Operation Inherent Resolve. Soldiers of the 29th led engagements and joint training with the Jordan Armed Forces and allied countries before returning in July 2017.

On 5 May 2018, Brig. Gen. John M. Epperly took command of the 29th Infantry Division from Maj. Gen. Blake C. Ortner. On 3 October 2020, Epperly was succeeded by Maj. Gen. John M. Rhodes.

== Division organization in 2026 ==
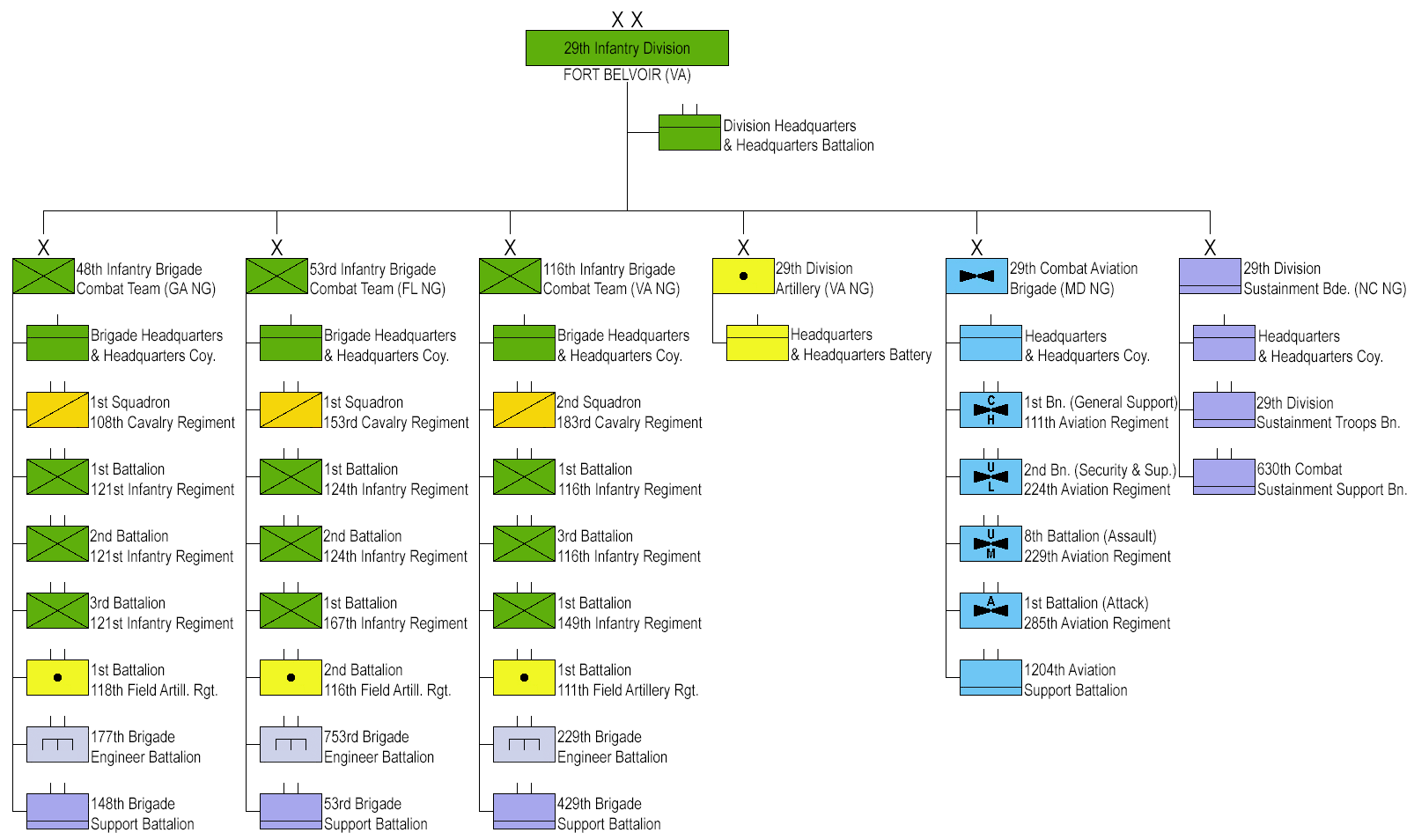
29th Infantry Division organization October 2026 (click to enlarge)

As of August 2023, the division headquarters exercised training and readiness oversight of the following units, which are not organic: the Alabama National Guard’s 226th Movement Enhancement Brigade, the Georgia National Guard’s 48th Infantry Brigade Combat Team, the Florida National Guard’s 53rd Infantry Brigade Combat Team, the Maryland National Guard’s 29th Expeditionary Combat Aviation Brigade, the North Carolina National Guard’s 113th Sustainment Brigade, the Virginia National Guard’s 116th Infantry Brigade Combat Team, and the Arkansas National Guard’s 142nd Fires Brigade.

- 29th Infantry Division (VA NG)
  - Headquarters and Headquarters Battalion (VA NG)
    - Headquarters and Support Company, Fort Belvoir, Virginia (VA NG)
    - Company A (Operations), Fort Belvoir, Virginia (VA NG)
    - Company B (Intelligence and Sustainment), Annapolis, Maryland (MD NG)
    - Company C (Signal), Cheltenham, Maryland (MD NG)
    - 29th Infantry Division Band (VA NG)
  - 48th Mobile Brigade Combat Team (GA NG)
    - Headquarters and Headquarters Company
    - 1st Battalion, 121st Infantry Regiment
    - 2nd Battalion, 121st Infantry Regiment
    - 3rd Battalion, 121st Infantry Regiment
  - 53rd Infantry Brigade Combat Team (FL NG) — will convert to a Mobile Brigade Combat Team
    - Headquarters and Headquarters Company
    - 1st Squadron, 153rd Cavalry Regiment
    - 1st Battalion, 124th Infantry Regiment
    - 2nd Battalion, 124th Infantry Regiment
    - 1st Battalion, 167th Infantry Regiment (AL NG)
    - 753rd Brigade Engineer Battalion
  - 116th Mobile Brigade Combat Team (VA NG)
    - Headquarters and Headquarters Company
    - 1st Battalion, 116th Infantry Regiment
    - 3rd Battalion, 116th Infantry Regiment
    - 1st Battalion, 149th Infantry Regiment (KY NG)
  - 29th Division Artillery (VA NG)
    - Headquarters and Headquarters Battery
    - 1st Battalion, 111th Field Artillery Regiment (VA NG; supports 116th Mobile Brigade Combat Team)
    - 2nd Battalion, 116th Field Artillery Regiment (FL NG; supports 53rd Infantry Brigade Combat Team)
    - 1st Battalion,118th Field Artillery Regiment (GA NG; supports 48th Mobile Brigade Combat Team)
  - 29th Combat Aviation Brigade (MD NG)
    - Headquarters and Headquarters Company
    - 1st Battalion, 111th Aviation Regiment (General Support) (FL NG)
    - 2nd Battalion, 224th Aviation Regiment (Security & Support) (VA NG)
    - 8th Battalion, 229th Aviation Regiment (Assault) (US Army Reserve)
    - 248th Aviation Support Battalion (IA NG)
  - 29th Division Sustainment Brigade
    - Headquarters and Headquarters Company
    - 29th Division Sustainment Troops Battalion
    - 53rd Brigade Support Battalion (FL NG; supports 53rd Infantry Brigade Combat Team)
    - 148th Light Support Battalion (GA NG; supports 48th Mobile Brigade Combat Team)
    - 429th Light Support Battalion (VA NG; supports 116th Mobile Brigade Combat Team)
    - 529th Division Sustainment Support Battalion
  - 226th Maneuver Enhancement Brigade — will convert to a Protection Brigade

Attached units:

- 142nd Field Artillery Brigade
  - Headquarters and Headquarters Battery (Fayetteville, Arkansas)
  - 1st Battalion, 142nd Field Artillery Regiment (Bentonville, Arkansas)
  - 2nd Battalion, 142nd Field Artillery Regiment (Barling, Arkansas)
  - 217th Brigade Support Battalion (Booneville, Arkansas)

== Honors ==
=== Unit decorations ===
Ribbon	Award	Year	Notes
A red ribbon with four vertical dark green stripes in the center.	French Croix de guerre, World War II (with Palm)	1944	Embroidered "BEACHES OF NORMANDY"
Red ribbon	Meritorious Unit Commendation	2017	Embroidered "SOUTHWEST ASIA 2016–2017"

=== Campaign streamers ===
Conflict	Streamer	Campaign	Year(s)
World War I		Alsace	1918
World War I		Meuse-Argonne	1918
World War II		Normandy (With Arrowhead)	1944
World War II		Northern France	1944
World War II		Rhineland	1945
World War II		Central Europe	1945
Global War on Terror		Inherent Resolve	2016–21

== Legacy ==
The 29th Infantry Division has been featured numerous times in popular media, particularly for its role on D-Day. The division's actions on Omaha Beach are featured prominently in the 1962 film The Longest Day, as well as in the 1998 film Saving Private Ryan. Soldiers of the division are featured in other films and television with smaller roles, such as in the 2009 film Inglourious Basterds and the 2005 film War of the Worlds.

The 29th Infantry Division is also featured in numerous video games related to World War II. The division's advance through Normandy and Europe is featured in the games Close Combat, Company of Heroes and Call of Duty 3, in which the player assumes the role of a soldier of the division.

A number of soldiers serving with the 29th Infantry Division have gone on to achieve notability for various reasons. Among them are highly decorated soldier Joseph A. Farinholt, soccer player James Ford, United States federal judge Alfred D. Barksdale, and historian Lawrence C. Wroth, generals Milton Reckord, Norman Cota, Charles D. W. Canham, and Donald Wilson. Major Thomas D. Howie who commanded 3d Battalion, 116th Infantry during the battle of St. Lo became immortalized as "The Major of St. Lo" for the honors rendered to him after being killed in action.

U.S. soldiers who received the Medal of Honor during service with the 29th Infantry Division include Henry Costin, Earle Davis Gregory, and Patrick Regan from World War I and Frank D. Peregory and Sherwood H. Hallman. from World War II.

== See also ==
- Joseph Balkoski, military historian and author of a five-volume history of the 29th Division in World War II
- Saving Private Ryan beach landing scene

== Sources ==
- Balkoski, Joseph (1989). Beyond the Beachhead: The 29th Infantry Division in Normandy. Stackpole Books. ISBN 978-0-8117-0221-8.
- Holmes, Richard (2004). The D-Day Experience: From the Invasion to the Liberation of Paris. Andrews McMeel Publishing, LLC. ISBN 978-0-7407-4509-6.
