= Edward Azrael =

American lawyer

- Born: June 30, 1907; Philadelphia, Pennsylvania, U.S.
- Died: October 10, 2001 (aged 94); Baltimore, Maryland, U.S.
- Education: University of Baltimore School of Law
- Occupation: lawyer

Edward Azrael (June 30, 1907 – November 10, 2001) was an American lawyer and member of the Maryland State Senate from 1968 to 1970.

== Personal life ==
He was Jewish.
