= Mary Azrael =

American writer

- Born: December 20, 1943 (age 82); Baltimore, Maryland, U.S.
- Occupations: author, poet

Mary Azrael (born December 20, 1943) is an American author and poet. Her poems have appeared in journals including Prairie Schooner, Harpers, and Calyx. She is the co-founder of Passager Books and an editor of national literary journal, Passager, which features the work of older writers.

== Publications ==
- Azrael, Mary. Victorians. Red Dust, 1981. ISBN 978-0873760393.
- Azrael, Mary. Riddles for a Naked Sailor. Stonevale Press, 1991. ISBN 978-0963138521.
- Azrael, Mary; Kopelke, Kendra. Keeping Time: 150 Years of Journal Writing. Passager Books, 2009. ISBN 978-0963138545.
- Azrael, Mary; Kopelke, Kendra. Burning Bright: Passager Celebrates 21 Years. Passager Books, 2011. ISBN 978-0983620907.
- Azrael, Mary. The House No House. DogBone, 2017. ISBN 978-0692862896.
