= Asriel Günzig =

Rabbi, scholar, bookseller, editor and writer

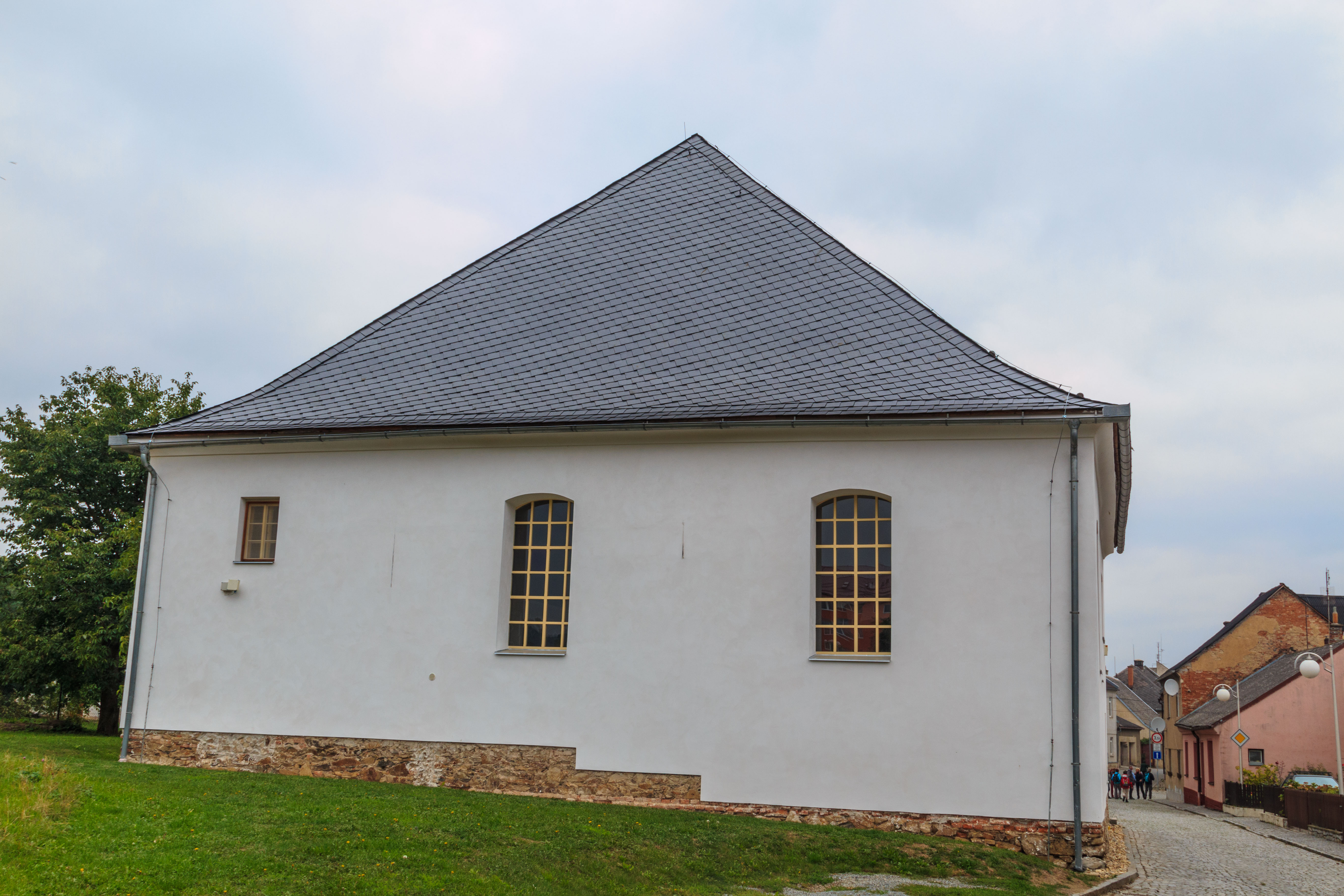
Synagogue in Loštice

Asriel Günzig (also known as Azriel Günzig, Ezriel Günzig, Israel Günzig, Izrael Günzig, or J. Günzig; 10 April 1868, Kraków – 1931, Antwerp) (Hebrew: עזריאל גינציג) was a rabbi, scholar, bookseller, editor and writer. He served as the rabbi of Loštice, Moravia, from 1899 until 1920.

== Life ==
Günzig was born on 10 April 1868 in Kraków, where he received traditional Talmudic education, and he finished his studies in philosophy and Semitic languages at the University of Bern, where he earned his doctorate.

In 1899, he became the rabbi of the Jewish Congregation in Loštice, a position he held until the spring of 1920, when he moved with his family to Antwerp, Belgium. In Antwerp, he became the head of the Hebrew Tachkemoni School and held this position for ten years. He died in Antwerp in 1931 at the age of 63.

== Family ==
Günzig and his wife Amalia (nee Schreiber) had four children: Regina (born 1898 in Kraków, died 1992), Sabine (born 1901 in Loštice; murdered at Auschwitz), Jacques (born 1904 in Loštice; murdered 28 July 1942 at the Mauthausen concentration camp) and Hilda (born 1910 in Loštice; died 1995).

== Works ==
His scholarly work was mainly focused on the history of Haskalah (Jewish Enlightenment) in Galicia, but he dealt with other subjects as well.

In 1898, Günzig published Japheth ha-Levi's commentary on Ecclesiastes 1–3.

His own published works include: Der Pessimismus im Judenthume (Kraków, 1899), Rabbi Israel Baal-Schem (Brno, 1908); Die "Wundermänner" im jüdischen Volke (Antwerp, 1921); and Das jüdische Schrifttum über den Wert des Lebens (Hannover, 1924).

From 1898 to 1913, he edited the Hebrew literary magazine Ha-Eshkol (Hebrew: האשכול). He also contributed to the Hebrew encyclopedia Ozar Yisrael.

Günzig also wrote on comparative religion and mysticism. In a 1900 Hebrew essay often translated as "Kabbalah and Indian Philosophy", published in Ha-Eshkol, he compared Kabbalah with Indian religious and philosophical traditions. Boaz Huss writes that Günzig drew on translations of the Upanishads, referred to Schopenhauer's high regard for the Vedas, and argued for a "wonderful resemblance" between Indian and Israelite religion.
