= 158th Cavalry Regiment =

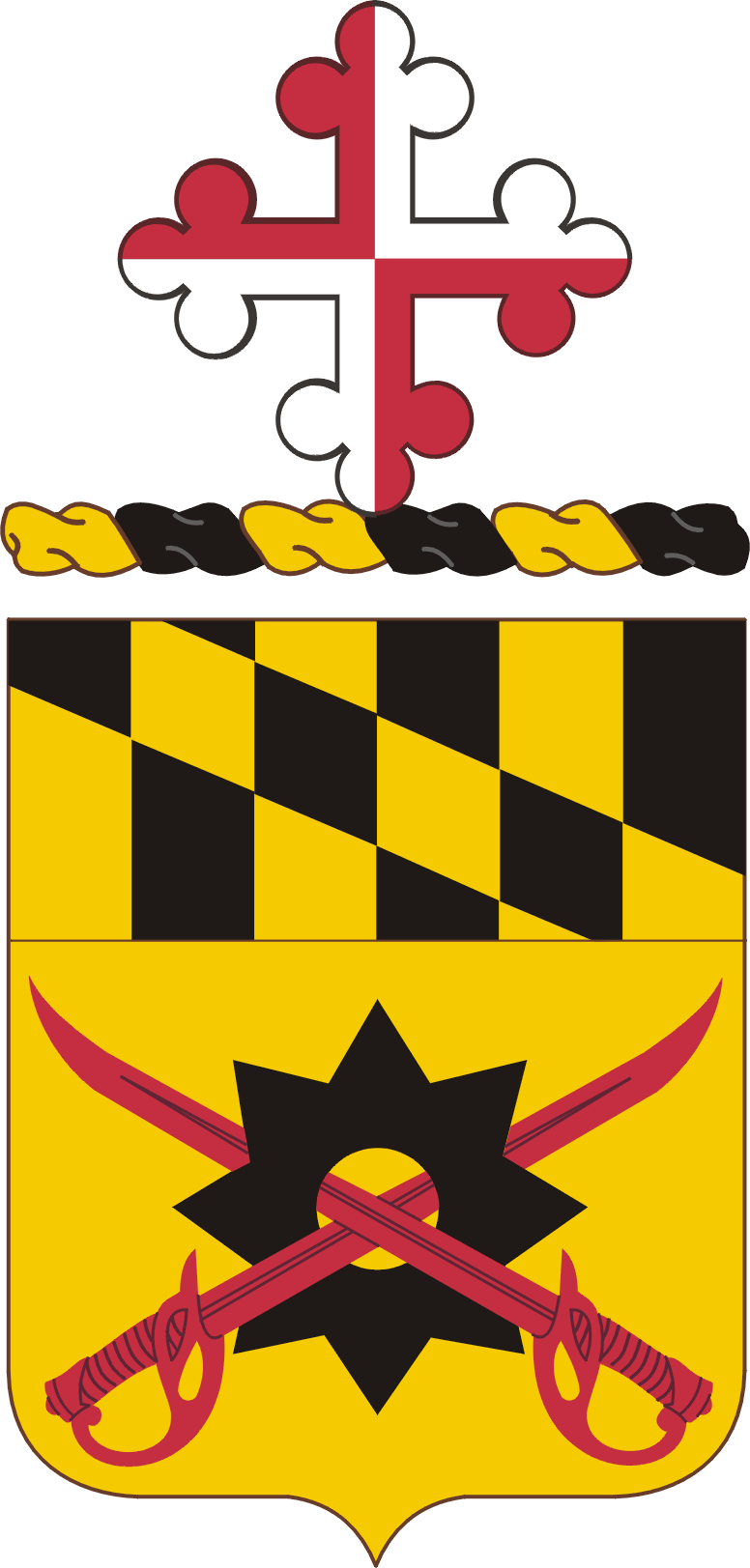
- Coat of Arms of the 158th Cavalry
- Active: 1975–2015
- Country: United States
- Branch: United States Army
- Type: Long Range Surveillance (Parent Regiment under United States Army Regimental System)
- Motto: "First to the Front"
- Engagements: Iraq War

Insignia
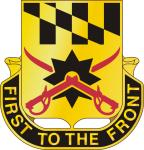
- Distinctive Unit Insignia

The 158th Cavalry Regiment was a United States Army cavalry regiment, represented in the Maryland Army National Guard by 1st Squadron, 158th Cavalry, part of the 58th Expeditionary Military Intelligence Brigade at Annapolis.

Constituted in 1975, the regiment's 1st Squadron carried on the lineage of Company M, 115th Infantry, which saw service in both World War I and World War II. The 1st Squadron was the 58th Infantry Brigade's reconnaissance unit and was deployed to Bosnia as part of Stabilization Force and to Iraq during Operation Iraqi Freedom. In 2009, it became a Long Range Surveillance unit when the brigade became the 58th Battlefield Surveillance Brigade. The squadron was inactivated in 2015 after the brigade reorganized as a military intelligence unit.

== History ==
=== Lineage of the 1st Squadron, 158th Cavalry ===
The 1st Squadron, 158th Cavalry traced its lineage back to the organization of the Governor's Guard, an independent infantry company, at Annapolis on 17 August 1877. On 7 May 1886, it became Company G of the 1st Regiment, Maryland Infantry. The company was mustered into Federal service at Pimlico on 17 May 1898 for the Spanish–American War as a unit of the 1st Maryland Volunteer Infantry. It trained with the regiment at Fort Monroe but did not complete training before the armistice went into effect on 12 August. The regiment was transferred to Camp Meade and then to Augusta, Georgia, where it mustered out on 28 February 1899.

On 29 March 1901, Company G was renamed Company M at Annapolis. It was mustered into Federal service on 28 June 1916 at Camp Laurel to serve on the Mexico–United States border, replacing Regular Army units participating in the Pancho Villa Expedition. With the regiment, Company M arrived by train at Eagle Pass, Texas in the first week of July 1916, where they spent time drilling and guarding the Eagle Pass–Piedras Negras International Bridge. The regiment left Eagle Pass, bound for Maryland, on 4 November, when it was mustered out.

The company was again mustered into Federal service on 25 July 1917 at Annapolis for service in the American Expeditionary Forces in World War I. On 1 October, it was redesignated as Company M, 115th Infantry Regiment, part of the 29th Infantry Division. The company was sent to the front in mid-1918 and fought in combat in Alsace and the Meuse-Argonne Offensive before being demobilized after the end of the war at Camp Meade on 2 June 1919. On 29 December 1920, the company reverted to its prewar designation of Company M, 1st Maryland Infantry, after being reorganized and Federally recognized.

On 1 January 1941, the company became Company M, 115th Infantry. It was inducted into Federal service on 3 February at Annapolis, serving with the 115th and the 29th Division in World War II. After being sent to England, the company participated in the Normandy landings at Omaha Beach in June and advanced east through France and Germany until the end of the war in May 1945. With the regiment, Company M returned to the United States and was inactivated on 17 January 1946 at Camp Kilmer. It was redesignated as the 29th Quartermaster Company on 20 June and reorganized and Federally recognized on 29 January 1947 at Annapolis. On 1 March 1963, the quartermaster company became Company A of the 229th Supply and Transport Battalion. On 21 January 1968, it was redesignated Troop B, 1st Squadron, 223rd Cavalry in the 28th Division when the 29th was inactivated.

=== 158th Cavalry ===
The 158th Cavalry was constituted on 31 March 1975 in the Maryland Army National Guard, a parent regiment under the Combat Arms Regimental System (CARS), and organized on 1 April from existing units. Troop A (Air) was redesignated from Troop D, 1st Squadron, 223rd Cavalry. Troop D was redesignated from Troop D, 1st Squadron, 183rd Cavalry after being relocated to Bel Air on 21 January 1968. It was constituted on 1 March 1959 as the 29th Aviation Company (part) and organized and Federally recognized on 7 July 1959 at Baltimore before being relocated to Edgewood on 1 May 1960. The company became Company B, 29th Aviation Battalion on 1 March 1963, and Troop D, 1st Squadron, 183rd Cavalry on 1 November 1965. Troop B was redesignated from Troop B, 1st Squadron, 223rd Cavalry Regiment. Both troops were part of the 58th Infantry Brigade. On 1 October 1975, Troop A became the 224th Aviation Company. On 1 July 1986, the regiment was reorganized to include 1st Squadron, part of the 29th Division, after the 29th was reactivated. The squadron became the division reconnaissance squadron and Troop B became the Headquarters and Headquarters Troop (HHT). Troop A, a ground reconnaissance unit, and Troop B and C, helicopter reconnaissance units, were newly organized. On 1 June 1989, the regiment was withdrawn from CARS and reorganized under the United States Army Regimental System (USARS) with headquarters at Annapolis.

Troop A mobilized in support of Stabilization Force 10 in Bosnia in 2001, deploying there in September. In September 2005, the UH-1-equipped squadron provided support and security to New Orleans residents in the aftermath of Hurricane Katrina. In August and September 2006, the 158th was deployed to Arizona to assist U.S. Customs and Border Protection in patrolling the United States–Mexico border. On 3 September 2006, B and C troops converted to ground reconnaissance. Around the same time, the squadron became part of the 58th Brigade Combat Team. In April 2007, the squadron was mobilized to deploy to Iraq in support of Operation Iraqi Freedom. Just before the deployment to Iraq, Troop C was merged into Troops A and B. HHT and B Troop were stationed at Camp Cropper, while Troop A was stationed at Camp Bucca. Troops A and B supported detainee operations at their respective facilities, and HHT built and operated the Iraqi Corrections Officer Training Academy, training Iraqi corrections officers. After the end of the nine-month deployment, Troop C was reformed from personnel of Troops A and B.

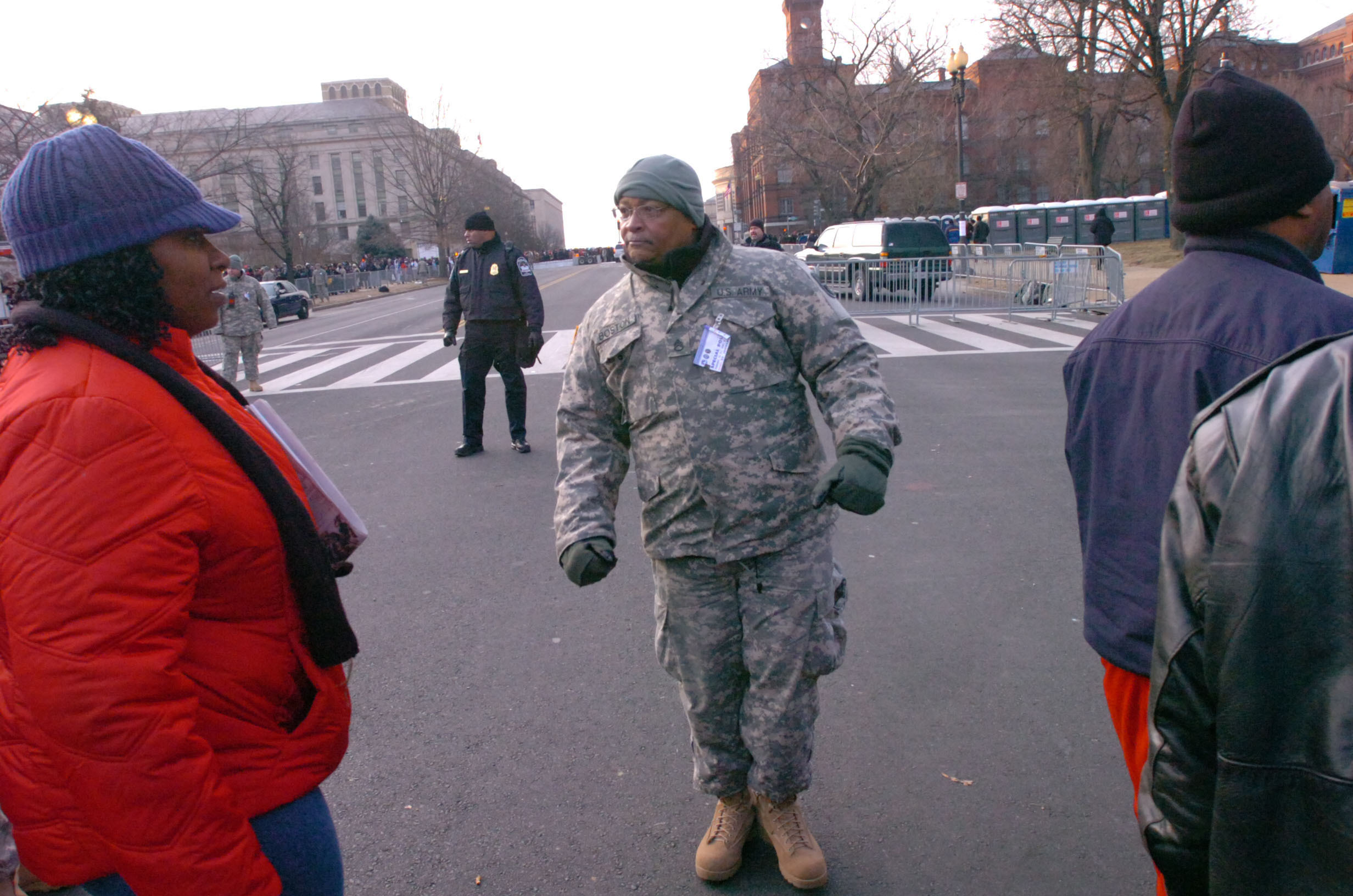
A Guardsman from the 158th Cavalry assists at the First inauguration of Barack Obama, 20 January 2009

On 5 May 2009, the 1st Squadron's Glen Burnie-based Troop C was merged with the Cascade-based 129th Infantry Detachment (Long Range Surveillance), retaining the Troop C designation. Troop C thus absorbed the Long Range Surveillance mission from the 129th, and the brigade concurrently became the 58th Battlefield Surveillance Brigade. The squadron was involved in the response to several blizzards from 2007 and Hurricane Sandy in November 2012. In mid-2013, the squadron participated in the Exportable Combat Training Capability (XCTC) combat training rotation in support of the 86th Infantry Brigade Combat Team. In April 2015, the squadron was sent into Baltimore to restore order after the 2015 Baltimore protests. In July, C Troop conducted its final training parachute jump. On 7 November, the squadron was inactivated as part of the brigade's reorganization as an Expeditionary Military Intelligence Brigade. Its last commander was Lieutenant Colonel Michael Duplechain, and most of its 329 personnel were reassigned to other units in the Maryland Army National Guard. It was replaced by the 629th Expeditionary Military Intelligence Battalion. When the unit was inactivated, HHT was at Annapolis, A Troop at Cheltenham, B Troop at Easton, and C Troop at Hagerstown.
