= 58th Expeditionary Military Intelligence Brigade =

Maryland Army National Guard formation

- Shoulder sleeve insignia
- Active: 1971–1985, 2006–present
- Country: United States
- Branch: United States Army National Guard
- Type: Military Intelligence
- Size: Brigade
- Part of: Maryland Army National Guard
- Garrison/HQ: Towson, Maryland
- Motto: Thunder
- Engagements: Iraq Campaign, War in Afghanistan (2001-2021)

Commanders
- Current commander: COL Michael Bryant
- Notable commanders: John M. Palmer (World War I)

Insignia
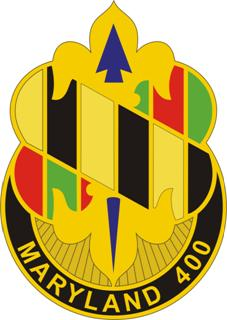
- Distinctive unit insignia

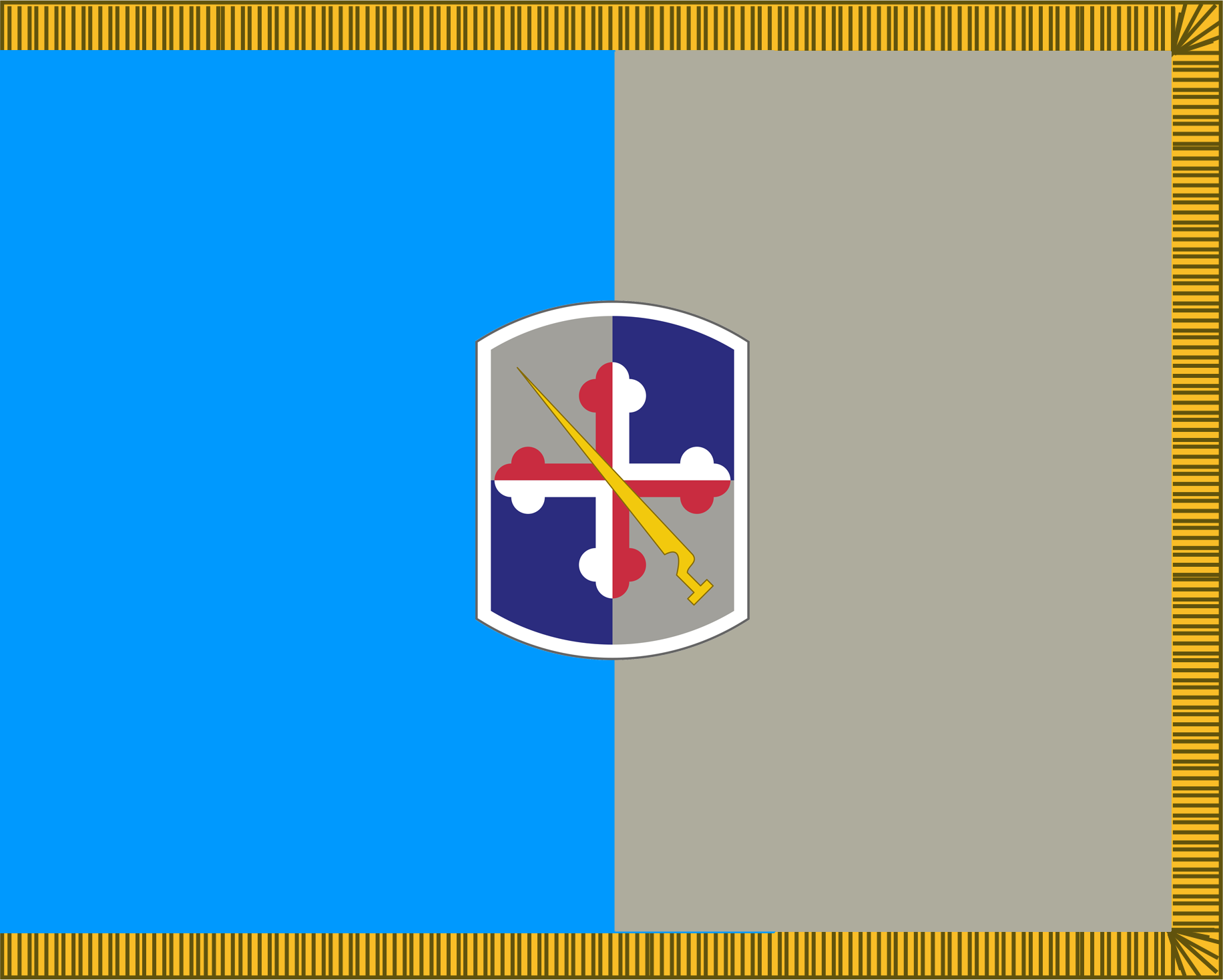
- 58th Military Intelligence Brigade Flag

The 58th Expeditionary Military Intelligence Brigade is a military intelligence brigade of the United States Army National Guard in Maryland. It was largely formed from the personnel and equipment of the 58th Battlefield Surveillance Brigade and officially stood up in its present configuration on 1 August 2015. Most recently, members of the brigade joined state efforts to contain the spread of COVID-19 in Maryland and constituted one of the last U.S. Army National Guard units to serve in the War in Afghanistan, returning to Maryland in February, 2021.

== History ==
The unit was first organized in 1917 as one of the 29th Infantry Division's two infantry brigades, and originally consisted of the 115th Infantry Regiment (Maryland) and 116th Infantry Regiment (Virginia) along with the 112th Machine Gun Battalion. In 1963, the Brigade was revived as the 3rd Brigade, 29th Infantry Division. In 1968, it was redesignated as the 3rd Brigade, 28th Infantry Division when the 29th Infantry Division was inactivated. In 1976, it was disassociated from the 28th Infantry Division and reorganized as the 58th Infantry Brigade (Separate). When the 29th Infantry Division reactivated in 1985, the brigade again assumed the "3rd Brigade" designation. It maintained this designation until 2006, when it was redesignated as part of its transformation into a modular brigade.

By FY 2007, as part of the overall shift to "more tooth, less tail," Army National Guard brigades were reorganized to form 34 brigade units following the modular design of the Active Army.

The 58th Infantry Brigade Combat Team was one of the primary units of the Maryland Army National Guard. It consisted of an infantry brigade combat team (IBCT) format of two infantry battalions, one light cavalry squadron, one towed artillery battalion, a brigade support battalion and a special troops battalion. It deployed overseas for combat service in the Iraq theater during the war on terror in 2007. This was the brigade's first combat deployment in this configuration, although some of its subordinate units served in prior wars.

A front-page article in the 22 July 2015 issue of The Baltimore Sun, continued on page 14, covered the final parachute jump of Troop C (LRS), 1st Squadron, 158th Cavalry Regiment. The lineage and honors of the squadron, including the LRS unit, was consolidated with the 175th Infantry Regiment. The brigade was redesignated as the 58th Expeditionary Military Intelligence Brigade, and the 729th Brigade Support Company was redesignated as the 729th Quartermaster Composite Supply Company and subsequently transferred to the 1297th Combat Sustainment Support Battalion of the 29th Combat Aviation Brigade.

On 8 November 2015 an inactivation ceremony was held for the brigade's 1st Squadron (R&S), 158th Cavalry Regiment at the unit's armory in Annapolis, Maryland.

In May 2020, most of the brigade was deployed to conduct intelligence operations in Afghanistan, among the last American National Guard units to do so before the end of the War in Afghanistan (2001–2021). The 58th EMIB returned to Maryland in February, 2021.

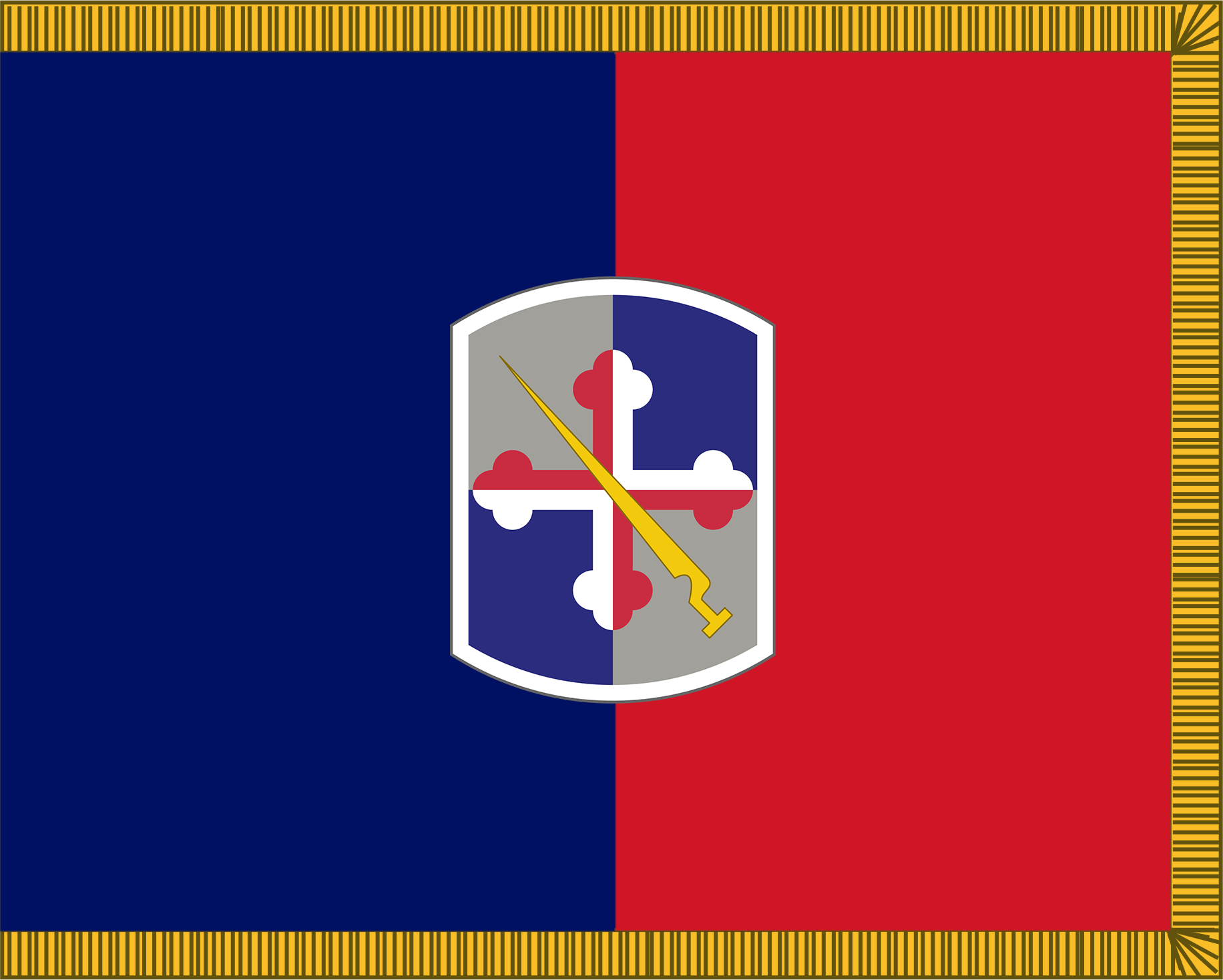
58th Infantry Brigade Flag

The most recent realignment of units came on April 1, 2022, as part of a larger shift among the Maryland Army National Guard. The 291st Digital Liaison Detachment was shifted to another brigade, while the 29th Mobile Public Affairs Detachment was shifted in from the 1297th CSSB. Presently, the brigade headquarters and two subcomponents are in Towson, Maryland, with major subordinate units headquartered in Annapolis, Maryland; Laurel, Maryland; and Baltimore, Maryland.

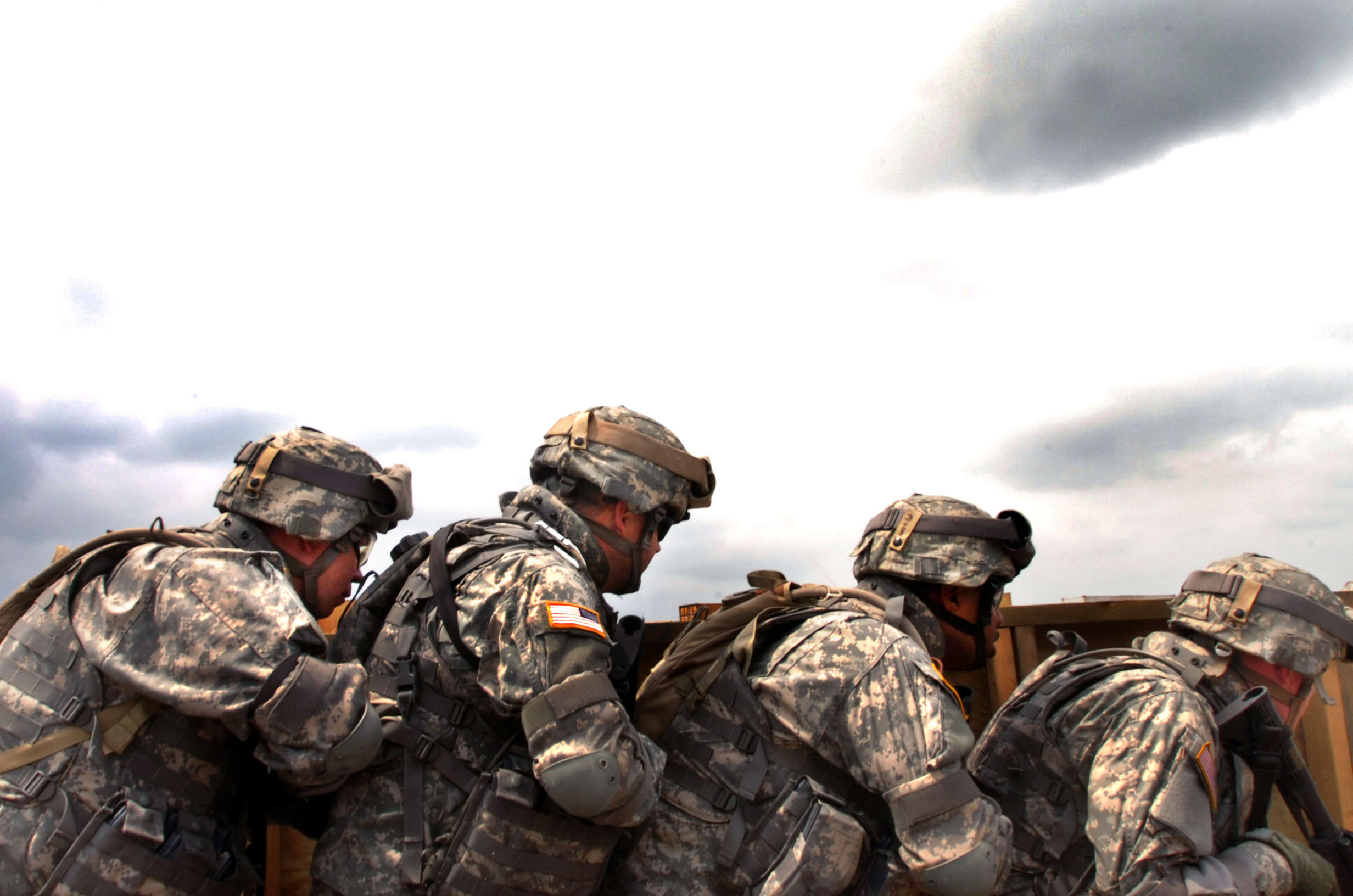
58th soldiers conduct training

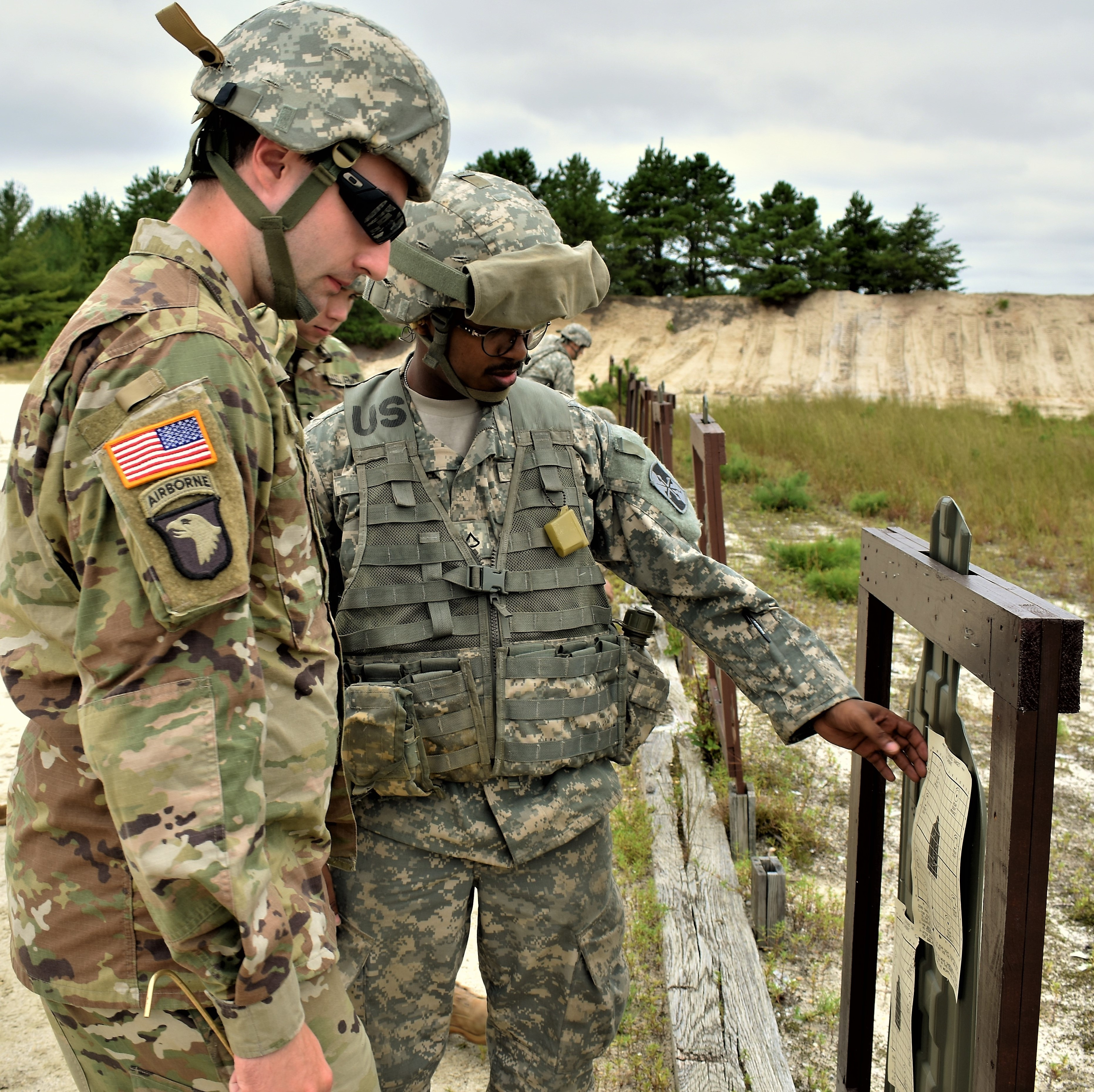
Soldiers prepare for IWQ during annual training.

== Current Units ==
- Headquarters and Headquarters Company, 58th EMIB
- Company B, 2-20th Special Forces Group
- 629th Intelligence and Electronic Warfare Battalion
- 110th Information Operations Battalion
- 169th Cyber Protection Team
- Detachment 1, HHC; Company B (-); and Company C (-), HHBN, 29th Infantry Division
- 29th Mobile Public Affairs Detachment
- Special Operations Detachment - OTAN/NATO

== Former Units ==
- 1st Squadron, 158th Cavalry Regiment (inactivated on 8 November 2015)
- 2nd Battalion, 200th Infantry Regiment (NM ARNG) (no longer part of the brigade)
- 2nd Battalion, 110th Field Artillery Regiment (inactivated in late 2008; insignia redesignated for the 110th Information Operations Battalion)
- 729th Brigade Support Battalion (inactivated 2009; reduced in size and reorganized as the 729th Support Company)
- Special Troops Battalion, 58th Brigade Combat Team (inactivated 2009)
- 629th Signal Company (Network Support), inactivated on 30 September 2018
- 291st Digital Liaison Detachment (transferred to the 58th Troop Command, MDARNG, in April 2022)

The 1st Squadron, 158th Cavalry Regiment included Troop C (LRS), which previously existed under the designation 129th Infantry Detachment (LRS) and Company E (LRS), 629th Military Intelligence Battalion when the LRS unit was under the 29th Infantry Division. Troop C was the only Airborne unit within the 58th BfSB.

== Additional information ==
- Globalsecurity.org: 58th Infantry Brigade Combat Team
- National Guard Battlefield Surveillance Brigades
