= 115th Infantry Regiment (United States) =

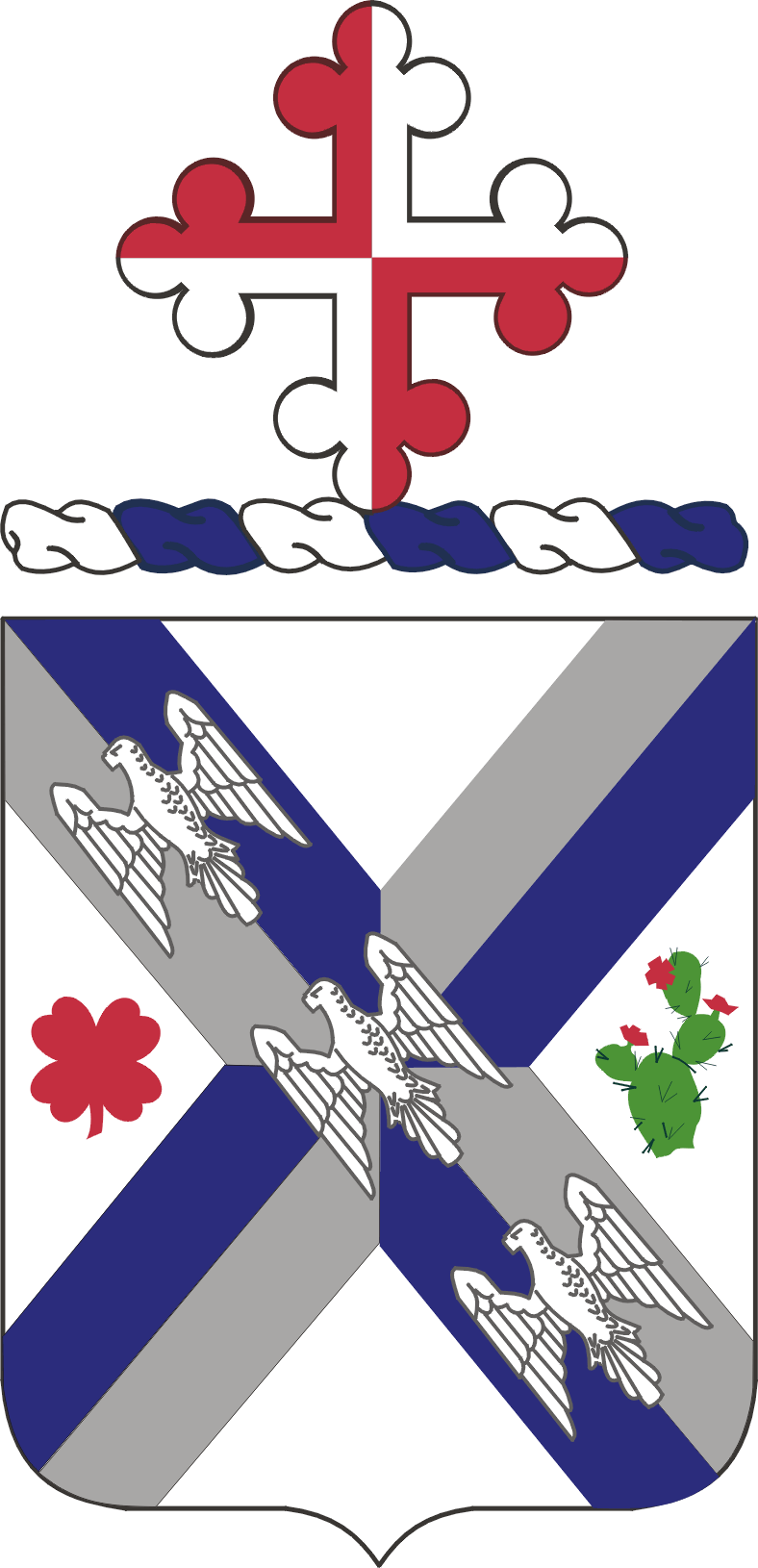
- Coat of arms
- Active: 1881–2006
- Country: United States
- Allegiance: Maryland
- Branch: United States Army
- Type: Infantry
- Garrison/HQ: Silver Spring, Maryland, Frederick, Maryland, Olney, Maryland, Greenbelt, Maryland
- Motto: Rally Round The Flag/"Old Line State"
- Anniversaries: 14 June 1775
- Engagements: Revolutionary War; *Battle of Long Island; American Civil War; *Battle of Front Royal; War with Spain; World War I World War II; Global War on Terror.

Commanders
- Notable commanders: Colonel John R. Kenly; Colonel Bradley T. Johnson; Colonel Edward H. McDaniel; Colonel William O. Blandford; Major Milton A. Reckord; Major D. John Markey

Insignia
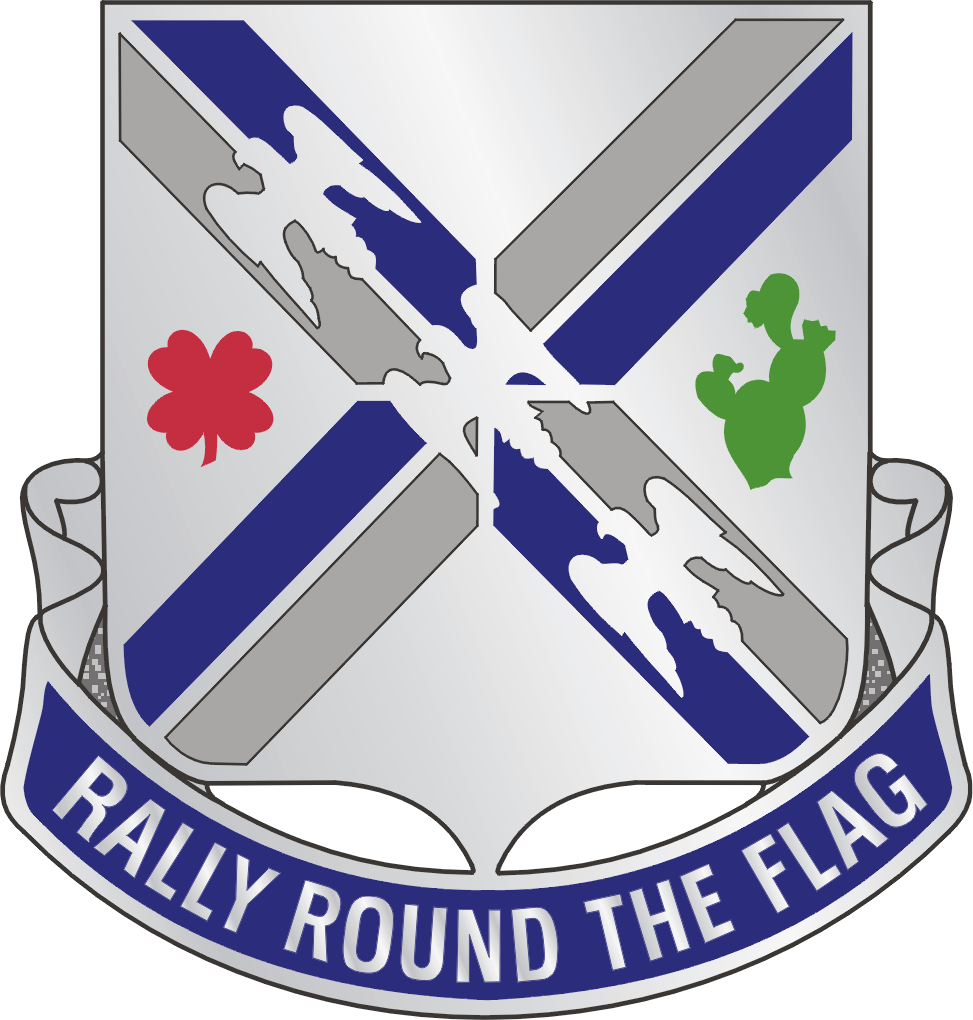
- Distinctive unit insignia

The 115th Infantry Regiment, Maryland Army National Guard was an infantry regiment of the United States Army. It purportedly traced its roots back to the American Revolutionary War, although its official U.S. Army lineage begins in 1881, and the 115th itself was only credited with service in World War I, World War II, and the Global War on Terror. Prior to the reorganization into the 58th Brigade Combat Team, the 1st Battalion, 115th Infantry Regiment was part of the 3rd Brigade, 29th Infantry Division (Light). In 2006, the 115th Infantry was consolidated (merged) with the 175th Infantry Regiment. As a result of this consolidation, it no longer exists as a separate regiment.

== Missions ==
The 1–115th IN had two major missions:

1. As part of the US Army under the "Total Army" concept, to deploy anywhere in the world and engage and defeat the enemies of the United States.
2. ..to assist the state authorities in providing emergency relief to the people of Maryland in the event of natural disasters, such as floods, tornadoes, hurricanes, and snowstorms, and to secure persons and property in times of civil disturbance. The unit also serves the community in other ways.

== Organization ==
=== HHC ===
The Headquarters and Headquarters Company, 1–115 Infantry, was located in Silver Spring, Maryland. While the rifle companies made up the bulk of the personnel and combat power of the battalion, the headquarters company was made up of specialties that extend and expand the capabilities of the battalion. It leads, supports, sustains, and protects.

Included in the headquarters company were:

- Anti-armor Platoon
- Communications Platoon
- Medical Platoon
- Mortar Platoon
- Reconnaissance Platoon
- Support Platoon

=== A Company ===
Alpha Company, 1–115 Infantry, located in Frederick, Maryland, was an Infantry Rifle Company.

Included in the company were:

- 3 rifle platoons
- Mortar section
- Anti-Armor section

=== B Company ===
Bravo Company, 1–115 Infantry, located in Olney, Maryland, was an Infantry Rifle Company.

Included in the company were:

- 3 rifle platoons
- Mortar section
- Anti-armor section

=== C Company ===
Charlie Company, 1–115 Infantry, located in Greenbelt, Maryland, was an Infantry Rifle Company.

Included in the company were:

- 3 rifle platoons
- Mortar section
- Anti-armor section

=== HHC ===
The Headquarters and Headquarters Company, 2–115 Infantry, was located in Chestertown, Maryland. While the rifle companies made up the bulk of the personnel and combat power of the battalion, the headquarters company was made up of specialties that extend and expand the capabilities of the battalion. It leads, supports, sustains, and protects.

Included in the headquarters company were:

- Anti-armor Platoon
- Communications Platoon
- Medical Platoon
- Mortar Platoon
- Reconnaissance Platoon
- Support Platoon

=== A Company ===
Alpha Company, 2–115 Infantry, located in Glen Burnie, Maryland, was an Infantry Rifle Company.

Included in the company were:

- 3 rifle platoons
- Mortar section
- Anti-Armor section

=== B Company ===
Bravo Company, 2–115 Infantry, located in Queen Anne, Maryland, was an Infantry Rifle Company.

Included in the company were:

- 3 rifle platoons
- Mortar section
- Anti-armor section

=== C Company ===
Charlie Company, 2–115 Infantry, located in Catonsville, Maryland, was an Infantry Rifle Company.

Included in the company were:

- 3 rifle platoons
- Mortar section
- Anti-armor section

== History ==
The 115th Infantry has long claimed lineage and honors that have not been recognized by the U.S. Army Center of Military history. The unit's official lineage and honors certificate only recognizes lineage extending back to 1881, while the regiment has traditionally held that it was descended from Cresap's Rifles, a company of infantry raised in 1775. The mismatch stems from a lineage system unique in the U.S. armed forces to the Army National Guard, which requires continuous militia presence in a particular community or, if a unit is moved, proof that the same members served in the unit at both locations. Because of a lack of support for militia units in the 1870s, many, including the First Maryland (predecessor to the 115th) ceased to exist as organized militia units. Army National Guard lineage rules state that any unit that becomes inactive has its lineage terminated, and that such lineage cannot be "resurrected," even if a unit with identical designation is later established.

=== Revolutionary War ===
The 115th Infantry unofficially claimed lineage back to the earliest militia units formed to protect the frontier of western Maryland. The birthdate of the unit, 14 June 1775, is also the birthdate of the United States Army. The first two companies to leave Maryland were assembled in Frederick in the summer of 1775 under the command of Captains Cresap and Price; they were organized in response to the Continental Congress' call to active duty. They left Frederick in August and marched 551 miles (887 km) in 21 days to report to General Washington in September to support Washington's efforts to drive the British out of Boston.

=== Civil War ===
During the Civil War, two First Maryland Infantry (USA) regimental infantry units were organized:

The 1st Maryland Infantry Regiment was organized at Baltimore, Maryland and 4 companies (A, B, C and D) were mustered into Union service on 16 May 1861. The regiment's first commanding officer was Col. John Kenly, a Baltimore attorney who had served in Mexican–American War as a major of volunteers.
The 1st Maryland Infantry, Potomac Home Brigade and four companies (A, B, D and I) recruited in Frederick County, one company (C) recruited from Baltimore City and three companies (E, F and H) recruited from Washington County and two other companies recruited from several counties was organized at Frederick, Maryland beginning 15 August 1861 and mustered in on 13 December 1861 for three years under the command of Colonel William P. Maulsby.

The 1st Regiment Maryland Volunteer Infantry (USA), commanded by Colonel John R. Kenly, and the 1st Maryland Infantry (CSA), commanded by Colonel Bradley T. Johnson, constituted the major part of the forces engaged at the Battle of Front Royal on 23 May 1862. During this battle, in which the Confederates were successful, Colonel Kenly gave utterance to the famous command, "Rally round the Flag," which is to this day the motto of the 115th Regiment. This was the only time in United States military history that two regiments of the same numerical designation and from the same state engaged each other in battle. The 1st Maryland Infantry, CSA had been composed primarily of soldiers the Baltimore-based Fifth Regiment.

=== 1880s to 1910s ===
For the first time in the United States Army's official history, the regiment was organized 29 September 1881 as the First Battalion of Infantry, Maryland Army National Guard, from existing independent companies at Hagerstown and Frederick, Maryland. This is the date of organization officially recognized as the start of the regiment's lineage by the U.S. Army. It was expanded and redesignated First Regiment of Infantry on 7 May 1886 by the consolidation of the First Battalion of Infantry with several more independent companies of infantry throughout the state.

The unit mustered into federal service 11 May 1898 as the First Maryland Infantry Regiment, U.S. Volunteers, and was assigned to the Second Army Corps during the Spanish–American War. The regiment was mustered out of Federal Service 15 March 1899 without serving outside the continental United States. On 28 June 1916 the regiment was again called into active service and saw duty at Eagle Pass, Texas during the Mexican Border Incident. Two of the battalion commanders who served during this period were Majors Milton A. Reckord (future Adjutant General, State of Maryland) and D. John Markey (future regimental commander). The unit was mustered out of federal service on 4 November 1916.

=== First World War ===
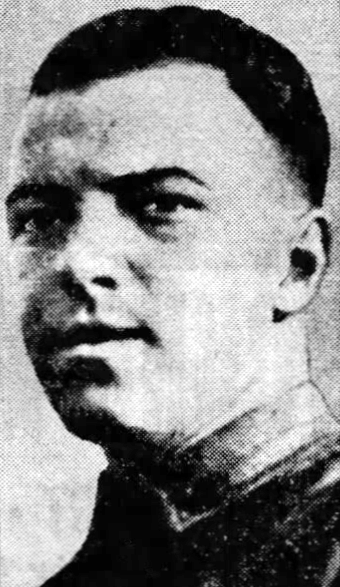
Private Henry G. Costin of the 115th Infantry Regiment was posthumously awarded the Medal of Honor for his actions on October 8, 1918, during the Meuse–Argonne offensive.

In October 1917, while at Camp McClellan, Alabama, the First Maryland was consolidated with the Fourth and Fifth Maryland Infantry Regiments to form the 115th Infantry Regiment. The 115th became one of the four regiments brought together into the 29th Infantry Division, which was formed in July 1917, at Sea Girt, New Jersey. The division was not even a year old when it received its baptism of fire in France. Company K, 115th, was the first unit in the 29th Division to engage the enemy when it repelled a German raid in July 1918.

During the Meuse-Argonne offensive they would fight for 21 straight days, moving over 6 miles (9.7 km), throwing back elements of six enemy divisions, and suffering a staggering 4,781 casualties in the process. After the Armistice was signed, the 29th Division was brought home in July 1919 and dissipated. The 1st Battalion, 115th Infantry, is authorized two campaign streamers for its service in World War I: one for Alsace and one for Meuse-Argonne. The next time the division would be reformed was for the maneuvers in 1936.

=== Interwar period ===
The 115th Infantry arrived at the port of Newport News on 24 May 1919 on the troopship USS Artemis and was demobilized 7 June 1919 at Camp George G. Meade, Maryland. Per the National Defense Act of 1920, the regiment was reconstituted in the National Guard in 1921 and allotted to the state of Maryland. It was organized as the 1st Infantry, Maryland National Guard, from 1919–23, and assigned to the 29th Division in 1921. The regimental headquarters was federally recognized on 22 January 1921 at Frederick, Maryland. Company G was called up to perform flood relief duties in Cumberland, Maryland, 12–14 May 24. Conducted annual summer training at Virginia Beach, Virginia, 1921–24, and Camp Albert C. Ritchie, Cascade, Maryland, 1925–39. Redesignated 115th Infantry on 1 January 1941.

=== Second World War ===
On 3 February 1941, the 115th Infantry Regiment was inducted into federal service as part of the partial mobilization of the National Guard for World War II, and then moved to Fort George G. Meade on 18 February 1941 to join the 29th Infantry Division. The regiment completed in-processing, traded in its equipment for modern equipment, and started to repeat its division level training. It was then transferred to the A.P. Hill Military Reservation on 22 April 1942 to participate in maneuvers, and then moved to the Carolina Maneuvers to participate in large unit maneuvers on 8 July 1942. It then moved on to Camp Blanding to fill its empty personnel slots on 19 August 1942, and then staged at Camp Kilmer on 20 September 1942, and shipped out from the New York Port of Embarkation on 5 October 1942 on the RMS Queen Mary and RMS Queen Elizabeth. They arrived in England on 11 October 1942, and then were attached to the 1st Infantry Division in preparation for the D-Day invasion. They moved with the 1st Infantry Division from 2 June 1944, and remained with 1st Infantry Division until 7 June 1944, when they returned to the 29th Infantry Division for further operations. Their participation in the Normandy Campaign continued until it was over on 24 July 1944. They immediately moved into the Northern France Campaign on 25 July 1944, which continued until it was over on 14 September 1944.

During this period the 115th Infantry Regiment was engaged in one of the war's forgotten chapters, "The Battle of Brest". The Battle for Brest was one of the fiercest battles fought during Operation Cobra, the Allied breakout of Normandy which began on 27 July 1944, during the Battle of Normandy during World War II.

Part of the Allied plan for the invasion of mainland Europe called for the capture of port facilities, in order to ensure the timely delivery of the enormous amount of war material required to supply the invading Allied forces (it was estimated that the 37 Allied divisions to be on the continent by September 1944 would need 26,000 tons of supplies each day). The main port the Allied forces hoped to seize and put into their service was Brest, in northwestern France.

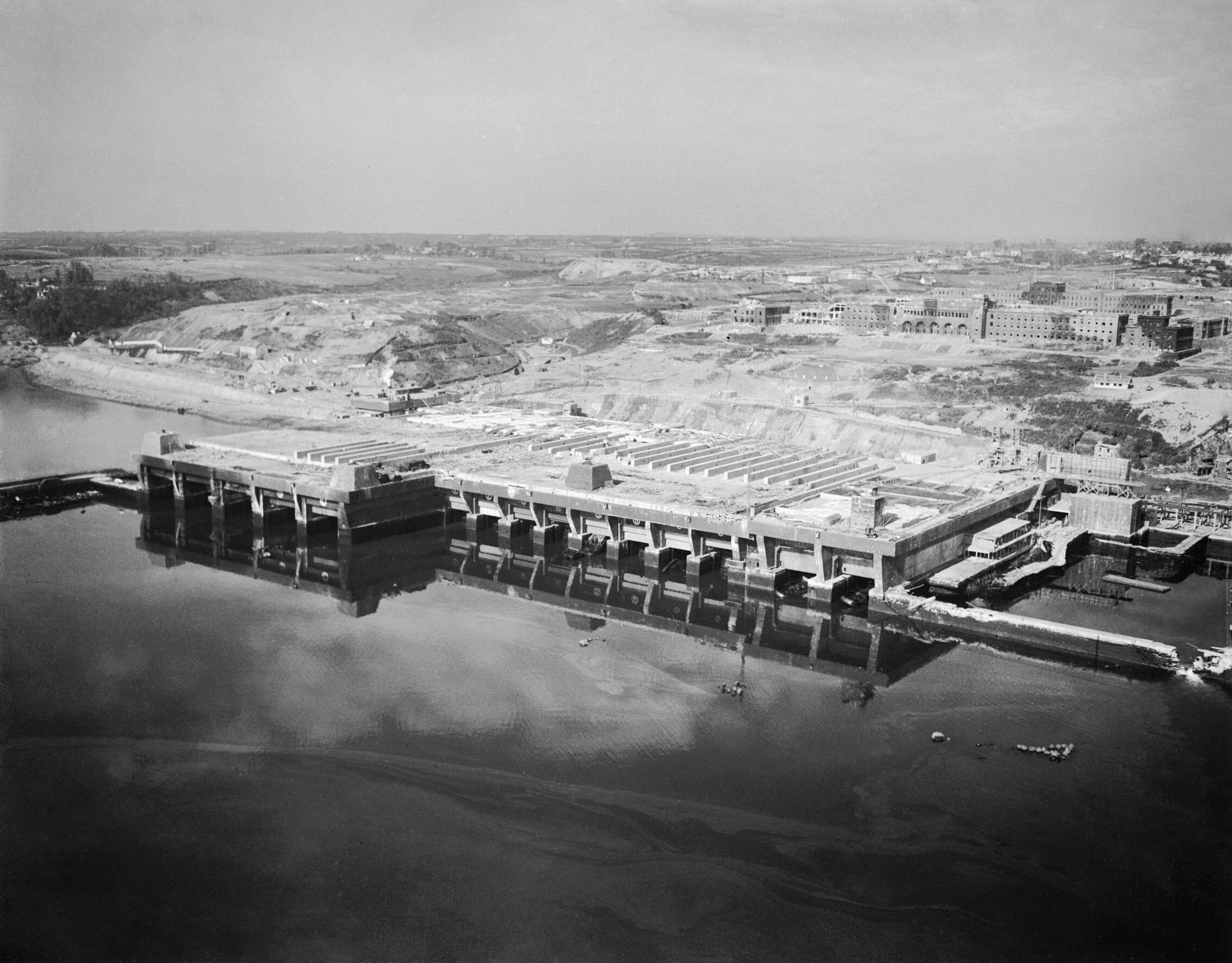
Concrete Submarine Pens at Brest

Brest also served as a major German U-boat base from 18 June 1940 until its surrender to U.S. forces during the Brittany Campaign.

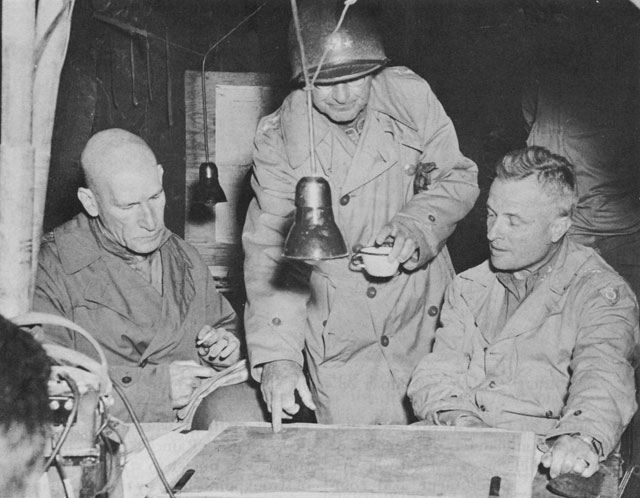
General Middleton confers with General Simpson (left) and General Stroh (right) near Brest

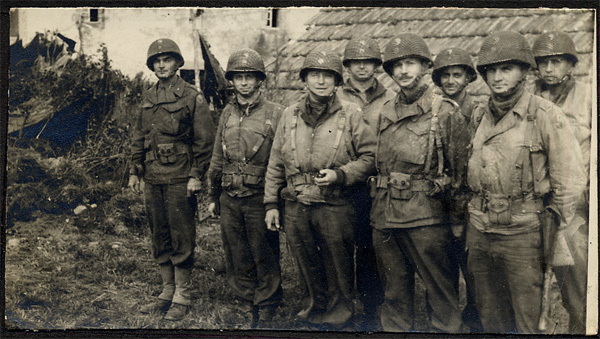
Officers from the 115th Regimental Combat Team of the 29th Infantry Division (Photo Taken September 1944). From Left to Right; Lt Col John P. Cooper (110th Field Artillery); Capt William Bruning; Lt Col Louis Smith; Major Glover Johns (VMI class of 1931); Major Anthony Miller Jr.; Major Harold Perkins; Major Randolph Millholland; Major William Bratton.

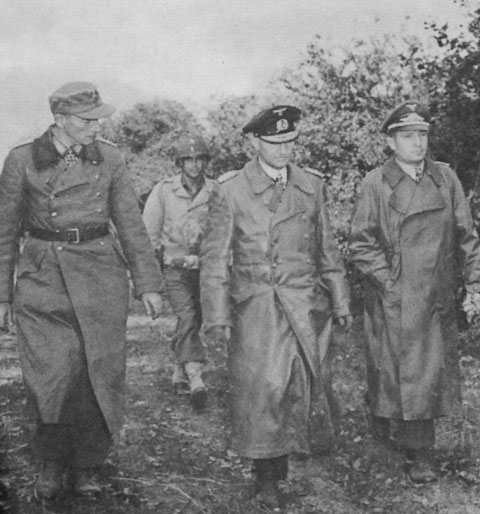

Generalmajor Hans von der Mosel, Konteradmiral Otto Kähler and Generalmajor Hans Kroh surrender at Brest.

The 115th Infantry then started participation in the Rhineland Campaign on 15 September 1944, whereupon the 115th Infantry crossed from France to Belgium and the Netherlands both on 27 September 1944, and entered Germany on 30 September 1944.

This campaign continued unabated until 21 March 1945, and the 115th Infantry did not take part in the Ardennes Campaign. With the end of the Rhineland Campaign, the 115th Infantry moved to the Central Europe Campaign on 22 March 1945, which continued until the end of Hostilities, which took place on 8 May 1945, but the campaign was not declared terminated until 11 May 1945.

The 115th Infantry was on occupation duty at Bremen, Germany on VE Day, and this continued through 1946. The regiment returned to the New York Port of Embarkation on 16 January 1946, and mustered out at Camp Kilmer the next day.

The 115th Regiment sustained 5,948 casualties during the fighting in Europe. Campaign streamers for Normandy (with arrowhead), North France, Rhineland, and Central Europe were added to the colors. Additional decorations included a distinguished unit streamer embroidered "St. Laurent-Sur-Mer," a streamer in the colors of the French Croix du Guerre with palms embroidered "St. Laurent-Sur-Mer," and, for the First Battalion, a streamer in the colors of the French Croix du Guerre with Silver Star embroidered "St. Lo."

=== Post-war to present ===
After the war the 29th Infantry Division came home; however, unlike the end of World War I, the division was retained as a National Guard division. In 1968, due to changing requirements, the division's colors were retired and its elements broken up into separate brigades. The 115th became part of the 28th Division, the Keystone Division of Pennsylvania. Later the 1–115th and other Maryland units were organized into the 58th Infantry Brigade, whose units were located entirely in Maryland.

In 1984 requirements changed again, prompting the reactivation of the 29th Infantry Division as a new, streamlined "Light" Infantry Division, ready to meet the demands of an ever-changing national defense, now and into the 21st century. The division was reactivated on 5 Oct 1985, and included the 115th and other historic regiments from Maryland and Virginia. As part of this reactivation, the 58th Infantry Brigade became the 3rd Brigade, 29th Infantry Division. Elements of the brigade included the 1st and 2nd Battalions, 115th Infantry.

In October 2001, in the aftermath of terrorist attacks on the continental United States, the battalions of the 115th were called to active federal service as part of Operation Noble Eagle. The 115th carried out critical security duties, protecting US federal installations from threats to the national security.

On 6 January 2005, Company B, 1–115th Infantry, mobilized again for active duty as part of Operation Iraqi Freedom. They were assigned as part of the 48th Infantry Brigade (Mechanized), based in Georgia, for this operation. They spent a year in Iraq. For the first 5 months they conducted operations in a town called Saba Al boor north of Baghdad that had a population of between 50,000 and 65,000. Saba Al Boor's population was half Sunni and Shia. B Co 1/115th was the main effort for Task Force 2/70th Armor which is an active duty unit from Ft. Riley, Kansas. B Co conducted raids, counter IED ambushes, air assaults, cordon and searches as well as combined patrols with the Iraqi Army. For the remaining 7 months they performed convoy security operations out of the Marine base at Al Asad. These convoy security missions included missions to country of Jordan, the Iraqi towns of Rawa, Hit, and al Taqaddum. During B Co's time conducting convoy security operations they were able to reduce the rate of losses from 11% of escorted equipment and supplies that was suffered by the unit previously conducting the mission to less than 2%.

In the beginning of 2006, the elements of the 115th were reorganized, along with the rest of the 3rd Brigade, 29th Infantry Division, as part of the 58th Infantry Brigade Combat Team. In August 2006 the colors for the 115th Infantry Regiment were cased and its lineage consolidated (merged) with that of the 175th Infantry Regiment (Fifth Maryland).

Since 2003 the heritage of the regiment lives on along Route 15 through Maryland, where the Maryland Senate dedicated it as the 115th Infantry Regiment Memorial Highway.
