= Air-sea rescue =

Coordinated search and rescue of survivors at sea

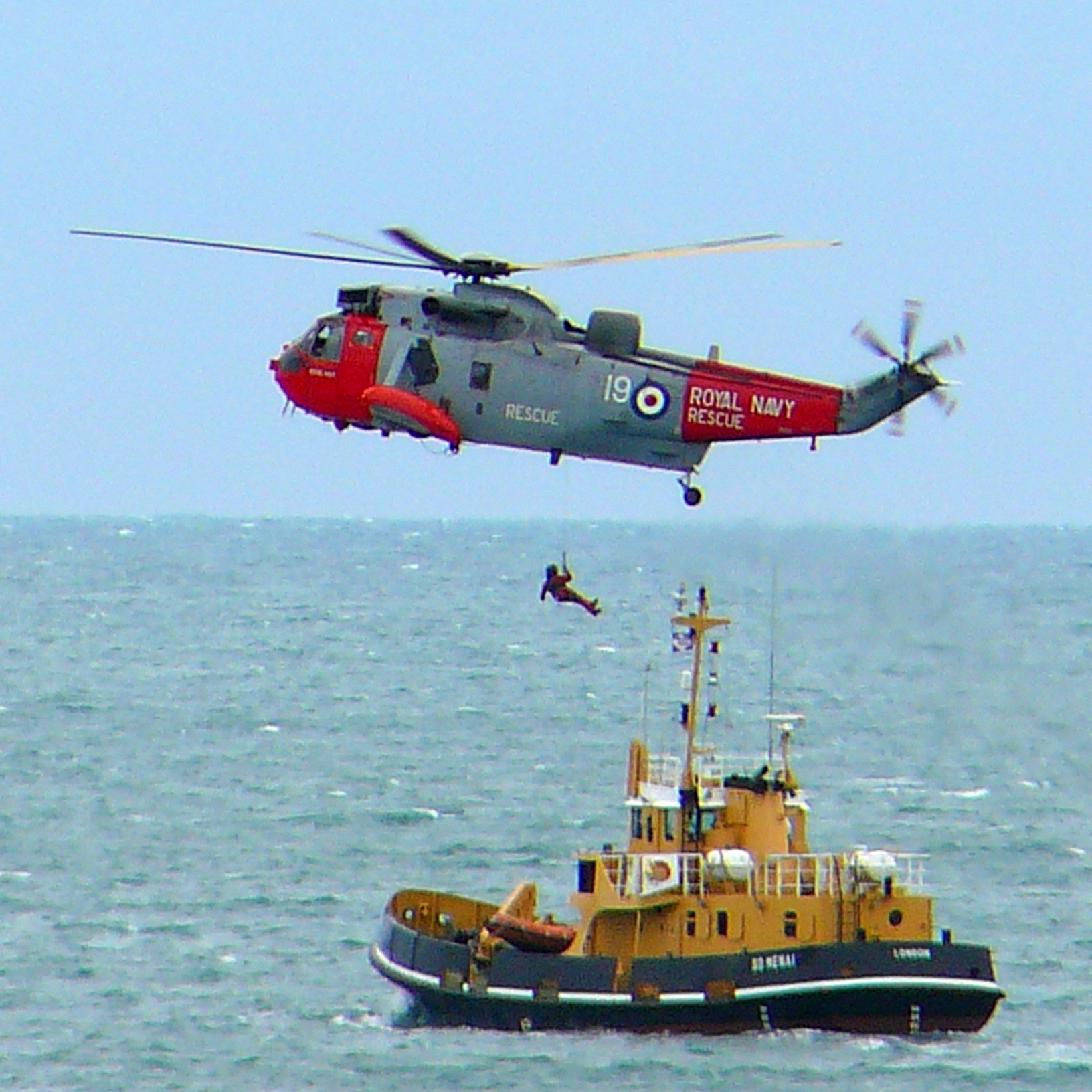
A Royal Navy rescue helicopter in action above a boat

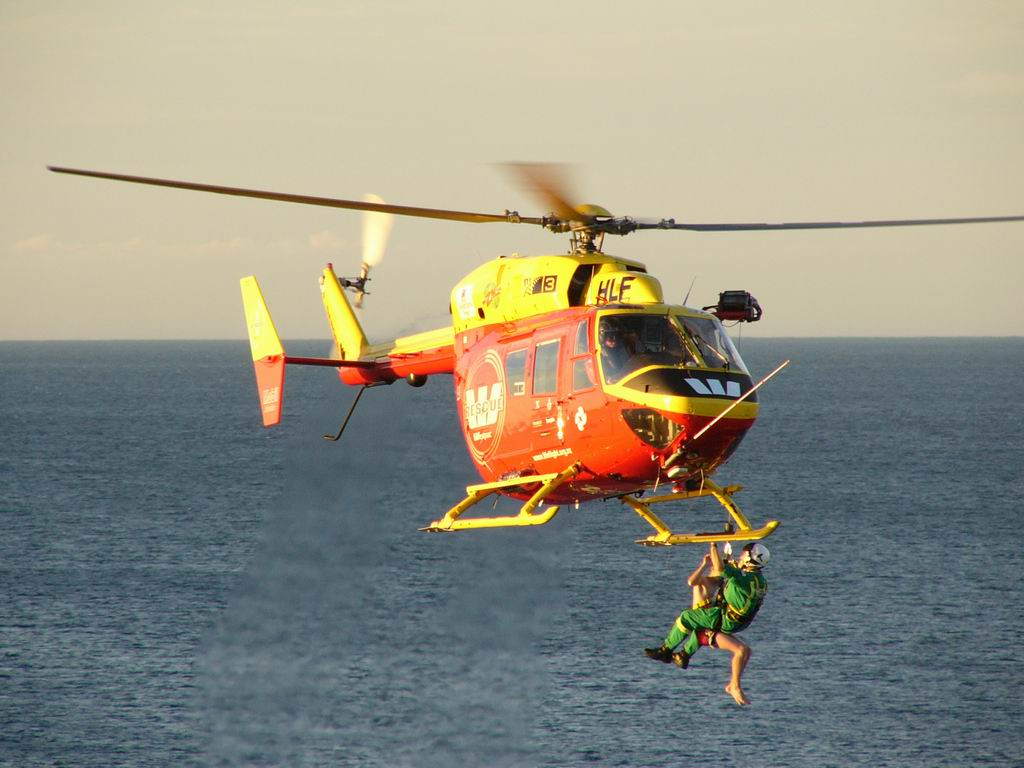
An Auckland Rescue Helicopter in action

Air-sea rescue (ASR or A/SR, also known as sea-air rescue), and aeronautical and maritime search and rescue (AMSAR) by the ICAO and IMO, is the coordinated search and rescue (SAR) of the survivors of emergency water landings and those who have survived the loss of their seagoing vessel. ASR can involve seaplanes, helicopters, submarines, rescue boats and ships. Specialized equipment and techniques have been developed. Both military and civilian units can perform air-sea rescue. Its principles are laid out in the International Aeronautical and Maritime Search and Rescue Manual. The International Convention on Maritime Search and Rescue is the legal framework that applies to international air-sea rescue.

Air-sea rescue operations carried out during times of conflict have been credited with saving valuable trained and experienced airmen. The knowledge that such operations are being carried out greatly enhanced the morale of the combat aircrew, faced with the expected hostile reaction of the enemy and the possible danger of aircraft malfunction during long overwater flights. As such, many militaries have opted to develop a capable air-sea rescue component, and ensure that such assets are available during most deployments.

Early air-sea rescue operations were performed by flying boats or floatplanes, with the first dedicated unit operating such aircraft being established near the final months of World War I. While initially restricted to in-shore operations and with limited equipment, capabilities and resources were expanded over the following decades. By the start of World War II, nations were operating capable air-sea rescue units that operated a combination of amphibious and land-based fixed wing aircraft.

Amid World War II, a major innovation was introduced in the form of the helicopter, which provided hover capabilities that were revolutionary for air-sea rescue. The first military helicopter air-sea rescue, by a Sikorsky S-51, occurred in 1946. Over the following decades, more capable rotorcraft, such as the Sikorsky SH-3 Sea King and Eurocopter HH-65 Dolphin, made longer range operations possible, with parallel advances in equipment improving both the speed and the level of help that air-sea rescue platforms could provide. The 1980s saw the introduction of training programs for the deployment of rescue swimmers, who have proved invaluable for recovering incapacitated personnel from the sea.

Air-sea rescue operations have been prominent in several major conflicts, such as the Korean War, Vietnam War, and Falklands War. By the start of the twenty-first century, numerous civilian organizations have involved themselves in providing air-sea rescue services, in some circumstances taking over this function from military operators.

== History ==
=== Origins ===
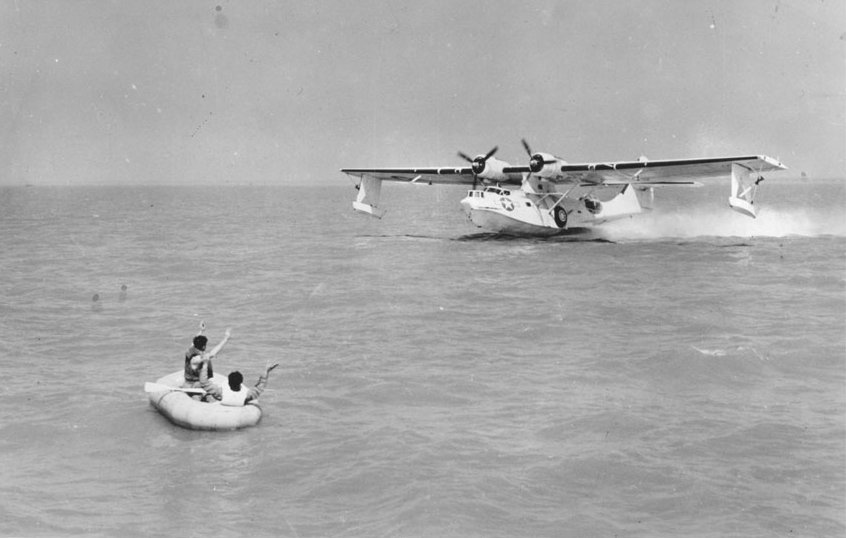
The PBY Catalina was one of the most popular flying boats used for air-sea rescue.

Initial air-sea rescue operations were performed either by flying boats or floatplanes; these were the pioneering approach used to pick up aviators or sailors who were has come into difficulties in the water. Any other aircraft design posed the additional danger of ditching in the water and requiring immediate rescue, while seaplanes could land on the water in an emergency and wait for rescue. Qualities such as their long range, endurance, and the ability to stay on station for long periods of time were commonly viewed as essential naval aviation requirements for rescue aircraft. Robust radio equipment was necessary for contact with land and ocean surface forces.

Training and weather accidents could require an aircrew to be rescued, and seaplanes were occasionally used for that purpose. The limitation was that if the water's surface were too rough, the aircraft would not be able to land. The most that could be done was to drop emergency supplies to the survivors, or to signal surface ships or rescue boats to guide them to the correct location.

The first attempts at an airplane rescuing a downed flyer at sea took place in August 1911, during the 1911 Chicago International Aviation Meet, when, in separate incidents, aviators St. Croix Johnstone and René Simon crashed into Lake Michigan. In both cases, pilot Hugh Robinson, in a Curtiss hydroplane, went out to try to rescue them, but in the case of Johnstone it was too late as the flyer had already drowned.

In contrast, Simon's plane had stayed afloat with Simon on top of it; Robinson spotted him and offered to pick him up and fly him back to shore. Simon, who was comfortable and smoking a cigarette, preferred to wait for a boat to come and tow both him and his plane back to dry land, which is what happened. As per one account at the time, this decision "wrestled from Simon and Robinson the distinction of being the first rescued and rescuer in an airship life-saving feat." Nonetheless, Robinson's role has been termed by one book as "the first airplane rescue at sea by another airplane". Other books have implied or stated that Robinson did in fact pick up Simon, but this does not align with contemporary accounts.

=== World War I ===
Dedicated air-sea rescue units were not organized by any nation until the end of World War I. Some rescues were performed by individuals and groups acting on their own initiative, such as the United States Navy Reserve pilot Ensign Charles Hammann who, during the Adriatic Campaign, rescued a fellow aviator adrift in the Adriatic Sea by landing on the water in his seaplane.

When the Marine Craft Section of the newly formed RAF, was formed in 1918, it inherited over 200 operational vessels from the RNAS. These boats were regarded primarily as seaplane tenders, being primarily tasked with the movement of cargo, munitions and crew from the land to the seaplane. Although the launches and pinnaces were equipped for rescue purposes, they were hindered in this role by the fact that they were hard pressed to make 10 knots (19 kilometres per hour) and were in a bad state of disrepair following their war service. The poor navigation skills of the post-war crews also restricted the scope of operations to a purely inshore one.

=== Interwar development ===
==== Britain ====
In 1929, T. E. Lawrence, better known as Lawrence of Arabia, joined the RAF, working at the flying boat station, Mount Batten in Plymouth Sound. He witnessed first-hand the deficiencies in the rescue system when a seaplane tender, despatched to save the survivors of an airplane crash in the Solent, arrived too late to save them before they drowned. He immediately began to press his commanding officer for the introduction of fast motorboat launches as rescue boats. Lawrence had experience using this type of vessel, having assisted with the 1929 Schneider Trophy race while at the helm of a Biscayne Baby, a fast boat when the temperamental engines were running.

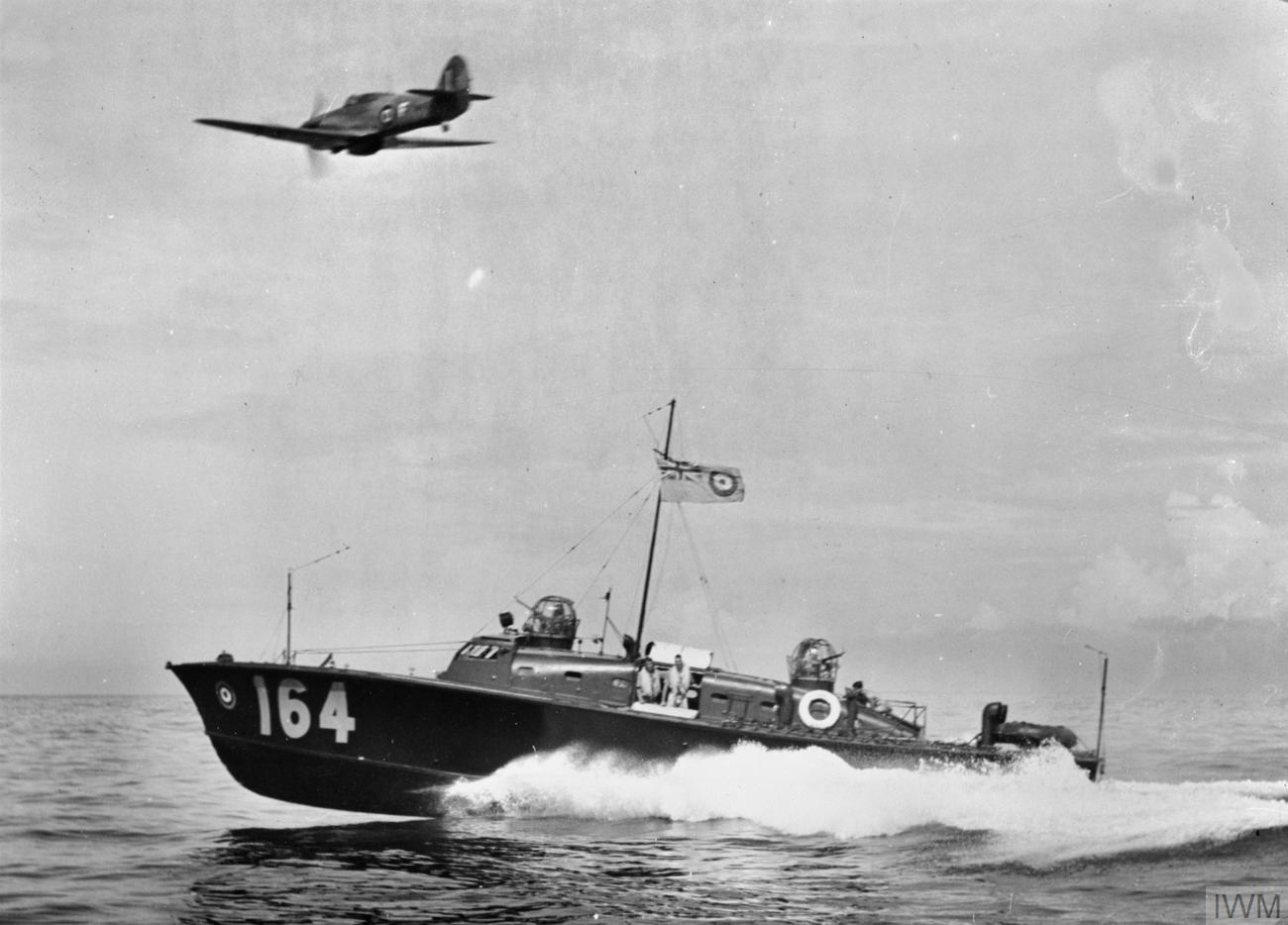
The Type Two 63 ft High-speed launch, designed by Hubert Scott-Paine in 1937.

Meanwhile, Hubert Scott-Paine, the designer of the record breaking Miss Britain III and Miss England boats and founder of the British Power Boat Company (BPBC), made a similar offer of his expertise to the RAF and he soon began to collaborate with Lawrence in the development of 40 ft (12.2 m) long high-speed launches, purpose-built for sea rescue. The result, built by the BPBC, was the 200-Class Seaplane tender; powered by two 100 HP engines it had a top speed of over 36 knots.

Testing on the launch continued from 1931–32 to ensure that the engines could run at sustained high speeds. The ship was an operational success and was followed up with the MkI and MkIA tenders, powered with Perkins Engines. These formed the mainstay of the Marine Section's rescue launches all the way to the Second World War.

Nine of these boats were ordered for use by the RAF Marine service by 1932. In 1935, larger 37 ft (11.3 m) boats were also ordered. These were fitted with Wireless systems that allowed the launch to communicate with the Station and the search aircraft, allowing for an efficient system of contact to be maintained.

The Type Two 63 ft HSL was designed in 1937 by Hubert Scott-Paine; 63 foot long and known as the Whaleback from the distinctive curve to its deck. This was the main high speed launch class ship used during the Second World War and was instrumental in the rescue of Allied aircrew from the sea after they were shot down.

The failure of the Marine Craft Section during the Battle of Britain led to the creation of the Air Sea Rescue Services, which with the motto 'the sea shall not have them', was created to coordinate at sea rescue with its own air sea rescue squadrons, Marine Branch and Royal Navy vessels, and Coastal Command flying boats.

==== Germany ====
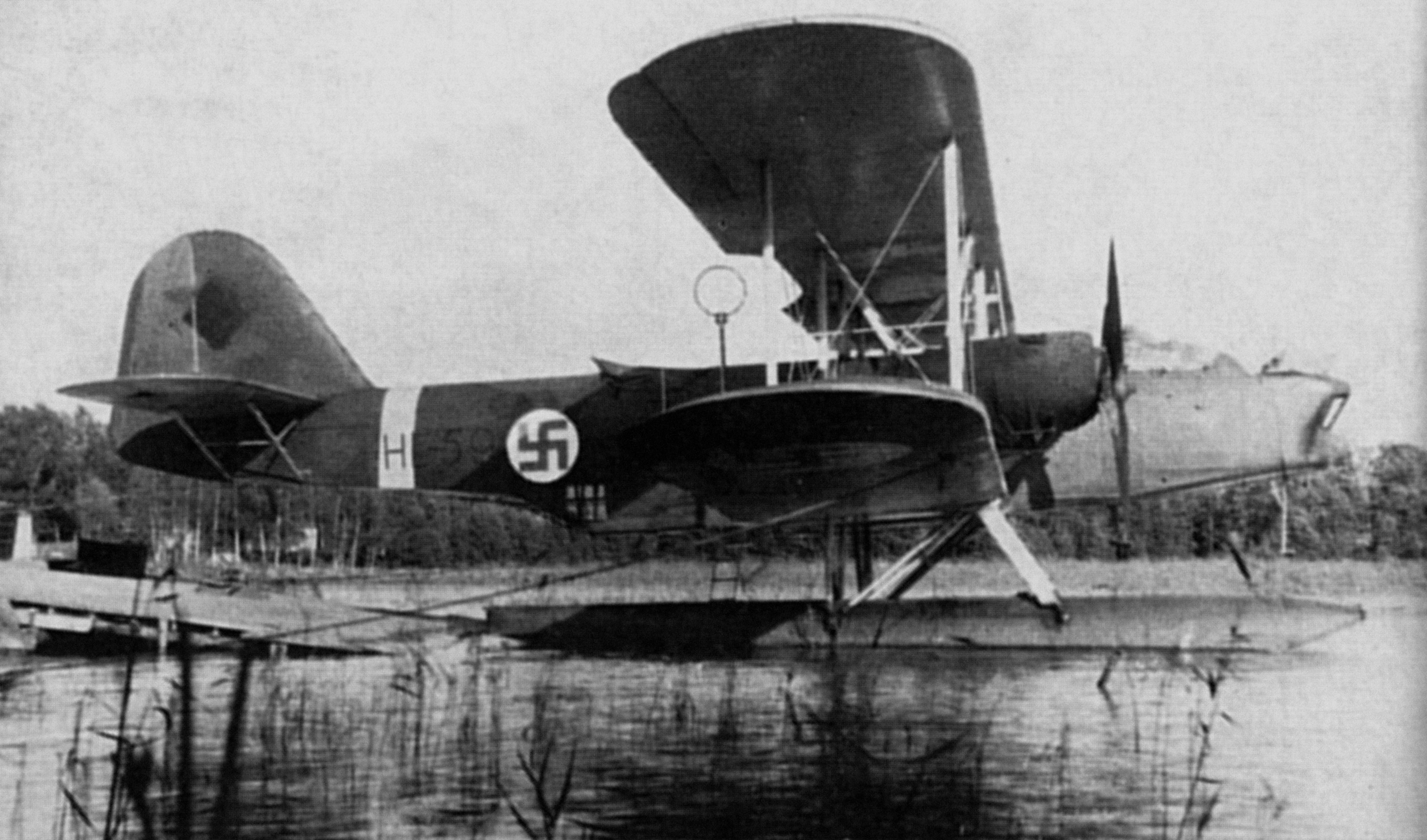
The German Seenotdienst operated 14 Heinkel He 59 floatplanes as well as a variety of fast boats.

In the 1930s, the principles of coordinating small surface boat rescue efforts with direction and assistance from air units were developed in Germany. In 1935, Lieutenant Colonel Konrad Goltz of the German Air Force (Luftwaffe), a supply officer based at the port of Kiel, was given the task of organizing the Seenotdienst (Sea Rescue Service), an air-sea rescue organization focusing on the North Sea and the Baltic Sea. Goltz coordinated with aircraft units of the Kriegsmarine and civilian lifeboat societies.

Early in 1939, with the growing probability of war against Great Britain, the Luftwaffe carried out large-scale rescue exercises over water. Land-based German bombers used for search duties proved inadequate in terms of range, thus new bomber air bases were constructed along the coast to facilitate an air net over the Baltic and North seas.

Following this, the Luftwaffe determined to procure a purpose-built air-sea rescue seaplane, choosing the Heinkel He 59, a twin-engine biplane with pontoons. 14 He 59s were fitted with first aid equipment, electrically heated sleeping bags, artificial respiration equipment, a floor hatch with a telescoping ladder to reach the water, a hoist, signaling devices, and lockers to hold all the gear.

==== United States ====
The United States Coast Guard acquired its first seaplanes in 1925 at Air Station Gloucester, and used them for coastal patrol as well as single, uncoordinated air rescue units. The air complement grew in the 1930s with the establishment of Air Station Salem and in the 1940s with the first formation of a dedicated U.S. domestic air-sea rescue service on the East Coast in 1944 at Salem.

=== World War II ===
==== Germany ====
The first multiple air-sea rescue operation occurred on 18 December 1939. A group of 24 British Vickers Wellington medium bombers were frustrated by low clouds and fog in their mission to bomb Wilhelmshaven, and they turned for home. The formation attracted the energetic attention of Luftwaffe pilots flying Bf 109 fighter aircraft as well as Bf 110 heavy fighters, and more than half of the Wellingtons went down in the North Sea. German Seenotdienst rescue boats based at Hörnum worked with He 59s to save some twenty British airmen from the icy water.

In 1940, the Seenotdienst added bases in Denmark, the Netherlands and France. The Heinkel He 59s were painted white in June, with red crosses to indicate emergency services. A few French seaplanes were modified for rescue and attached to the organization. In response to the heavy toll of German air action against Great Britain, Adolf Galland recommended that German pilots in trouble over the ocean make an emergency water landing in their aircraft instead of bailing out and parachuting down. The aircraft each carried an inflatable rubber raft which would help the airmen avoid hypothermia from continued immersion in the cold water, and increase the time available for rescue. British fighters such the Supermarine Spitfire and the Hawker Hurricane did not carry inflatable rafts, only lifejackets which were little help against the cold.

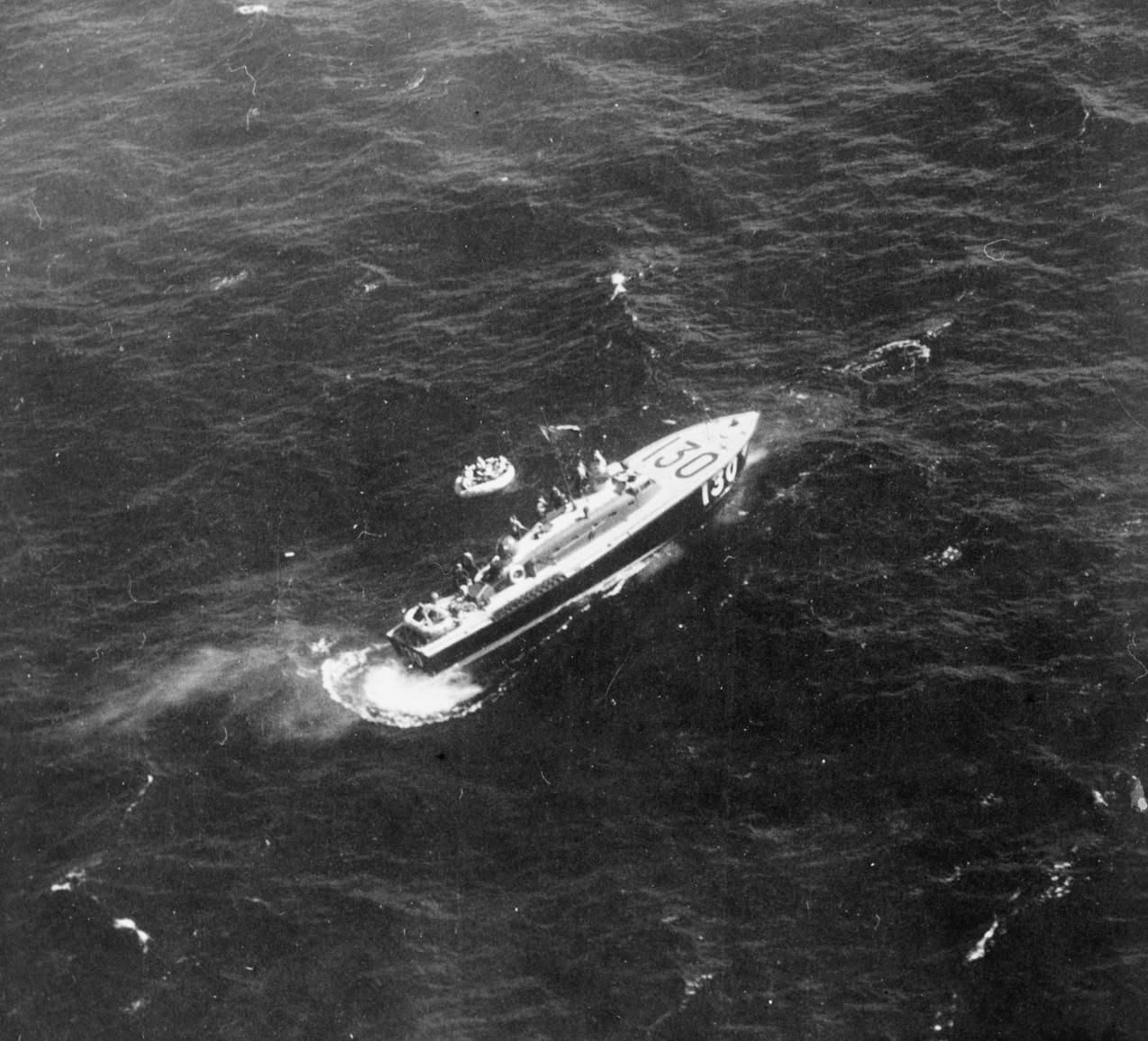
A British HSL 130 picking up a RAF Halifax crew off the Isle of Wight, 1942.

In July 1940, a white-painted He 59 operating near Deal, Kent was shot down and the crew taken captive because it was sharing the air with 12 Bf 109 fighters and the British were wary of Luftwaffe aircraft dropping spies and saboteurs. The German pilot's log showed that he had noted the position and direction of British convoys. British officials determined that this constituted military reconnaissance, not rescue work. The Air Ministry issued Bulletin 1254 indicating that all enemy air-sea rescue aircraft were to be destroyed if encountered. Winston Churchill later wrote "We did not recognise this means of rescuing enemy pilots who had been shot down in action, in order that they might come and bomb our civil population again."

Germany protested against this order on the grounds that rescue aircraft were part of the Geneva Convention agreement, stipulating that belligerents must respect each other's "mobile sanitary formations" such as field ambulances and hospital ships. Churchill argued that rescue aircraft were not anticipated by the treaty, and were not covered. British attacks on He 59s increased. The Seenotdienst ordered the rescue aircraft armed and painted in the camouflage scheme of their area of operation. Rescue flights were to be protected by fighter aircraft when possible.

In October 1940, yellow-painted Sea Rescue Floats were placed by the Germans in waters where air emergencies were likely. The highly visible buoy-type floats held emergency equipment including food, water, blankets and dry clothing, and they attracted distressed airmen from both sides of the war. Both German and British rescue units checked the floats from time to time, picking up any airmen they found, with enemy airmen were immediately made prisoner of war.

==== Britain ====
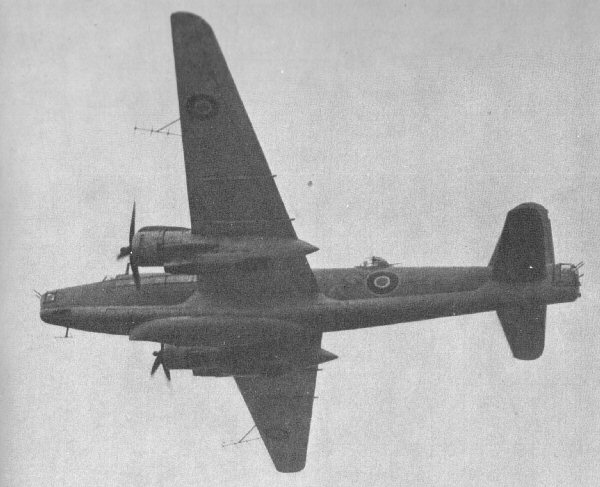
A Vickers Warwick bomber carrying the Uffa Fox-designed airborne lifeboat underneath.

Prior to the Second World War, there was still no fully functional coordinated British air-sea rescue organisation for rescuing aircrew from the sea. The aircrew relied on the High Speed Launches (HSL) established at flying boat bases. On 14 January 1941, the first air-sea rescue was set up, the Directorate of Air Sea Rescue Services. The service the aircraft used were diverse. Westland Lysanders were used to scouting the coastlines, while the Supermarine Walrus was planned to be used for long-term use.

By June 1941, rescue from the seas had increased to 35 percent. The Air Ministry decided the service could do better. It was merged with another Directorate, Aircraft Safety. On 23 September 1941 Air Marshal John Salmond took over the organisation.

In October 1941 No. 275 Squadron RAF and No. 278 Squadron RAF were assigned to ASR work. This was supported by two squadrons from Coastal Command equipped with Hudsons. No. 16 Group was authorised to create No. 279 Squadron RAF on 24 October to act as a specialised ASR squadron. No. 280 Squadron RAF was created on 28 November 1941 and was given Anson aircraft in place of Hudsons, as they were desperately needed for A/S operations.

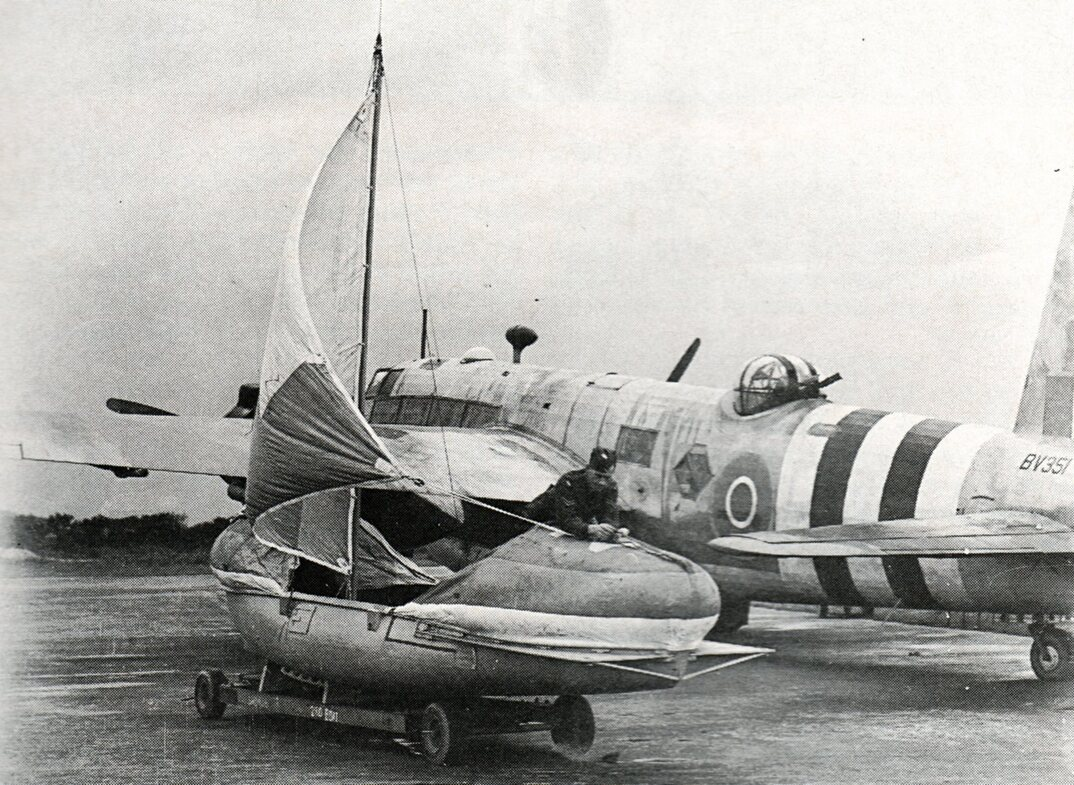
A British Mark I airborne lifeboat shown rigged for sailing, in front of a Vickers Warwick rescue aircraft

The British developed the first air-dropped lifeboat; a 32-foot (10 m) wooden canoe-shaped boat designed in 1943 by Uffa Fox was to be dropped by RAF Avro Lancaster heavy bombers for the rescue of aircrew downed in the Channel. The lifeboat was dropped from a height of 700 feet (210 m), and its descent to the water was slowed by six parachutes. It was balanced so that it would right itself if it overturned—all subsequent airborne lifeboats were given this feature. When it hit the water the parachutes were jettisoned and rockets launched 300 ft (90 m) lifelines. Coamings were inflated on the descent to give it self-righting.

Fox's airborne lifeboat weighed 1,700 pounds (770 kg) and included two 4-horsepower (3 kW) motors—sufficient to make about 6 knots—augmented by a mast and sails along with an instruction book to teach aircrew the rudiments of sailing. The lifeboats were first carried by Lockheed Hudson aircraft in February 1943. Later, Vickers Warwick bombers carried the Mark II lifeboat. The Fox boats successfully saved downed aircrew as well as glider infantrymen dropped in the water during Operation Market-Garden. The lifeboats carried emergency equipment, a radio, waterproof suits, rations and medical supplies.

Aircraft suitability once again came in for discussion during the war. Ansons and Boulton Paul Defiants were not suitable for ASR operations. The Vickers Warwick was earmarked for the main ASR aircraft. Four 20-aircraft squadrons with specialised ASR conversion were to be made available by the spring, 1943. While development was slow, the effort paid off. In May 1943, 156 men of Bomber Command were rescued from the sea by No. 279 Squadron alone.

By the end of 1943, Coastal Command had rescued 1,684 aircrew out of 5,466 presumed to have ditched in the sea. On D-Day, 6 June 1944, 163 aircrew and 60 other personnel were rescued. During the month, June 1944, 355 were saved by ASR units of Coastal Command. In all, 10,663 persons were rescued by Coastal Command in ASR operations. Of this total, 5,721 were Allied aircrew, 277 enemy aircrew, and 4,665 non-aircrew. By the end of the war, British ASR had saved over 13,000 lives and was one of the largest such organisations in the world.

==== United States ====
In the Pacific Ocean theater, the first purposely assigned rescue aircraft, a PBY Catalina, was given the mission of plucking downed airmen from the ocean in January 1943. From January to August, such rescue flights based at Guadalcanal saved 161 aviators.

Beginning in November 1943, during the Gilbert and Marshall Islands campaign, American submarines were tasked with the rescue of U.S. Navy and Marine airmen downed during aircraft carrier attack operations. Submarines were often vectored to a rescue site by aircraft providing coordinates, but too many layers of command slowed the cooperation considerably. Long-range naval patrol aircraft were fitted with extra radio equipment to allow direct contact with surface and underwater units. By the end of 1944, some 224 airmen had been rescued by submarine.

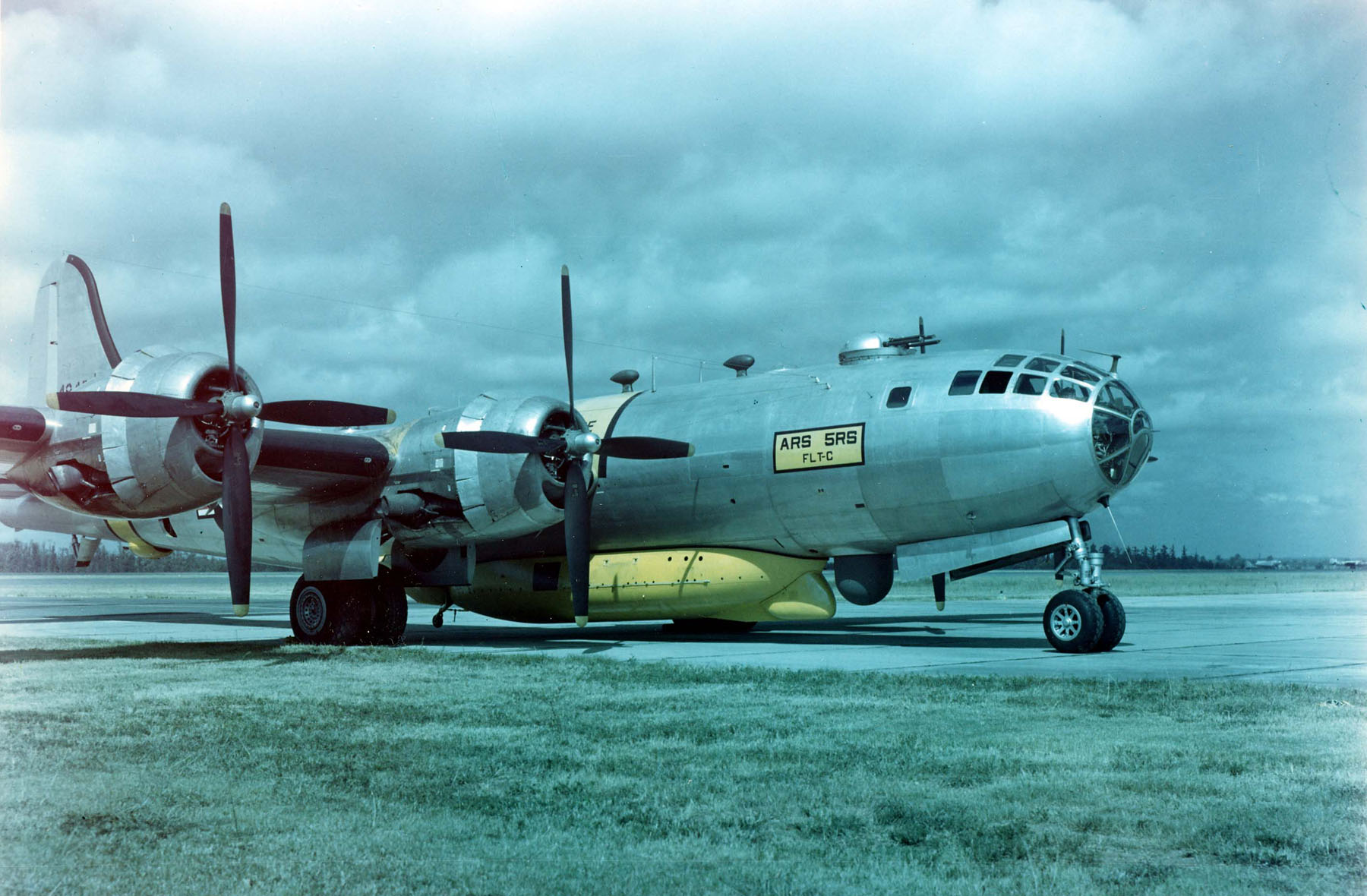
An SB-29 "Super Dumbo", a variant of the B-29 Superfortress, with an air-droppable EDO A-3 lifeboat rigged underneath

Dumbo aircraft, converted land-based heavy bombers named after Walt Disney's animated flying elephant, were sent aloft in the Pacific War to patrol likely areas where American airmen might ditch. The Dumbo would radio the position of any survivors spotted in the water, and it would drop emergency supplies such as an airborne lifeboat, by parachute. A nearby ship or submarine could be requested to come rescue the survivors, or an air-sea rescue station could be signaled to send a rescue boat or flying boat.

In the last eight months of World War II, Dumbo operations complemented simultaneous United States Army Air Forces heavy bombing operations against Japanese targets. On any one large-scale bombing mission carried out by Boeing B-29 Superfortresses, at least three submarines were posted along the air route, and Dumbo aircraft sent to patrol the distant waters, and listen for emergency radio transmissions from distressed aircraft. At the final bombing mission on August 14, 1945, 9 land-based Dumbos and 21 flying boats covered a surface and sub-surface force of 14 submarines and 5 rescue ships.

=== Introduction of the helicopter ===
Helicopters were first introduced to the role of air-sea rescue in the 1940s. The United States Coast Guard (USCG) was the first agency to evaluate the potential of helicopter rescue assistance, beginning in 1938. USCG Commander William J. Kossler witnessed a helicopter demonstration flight by Igor Sikorsky, flying the Vought-Sikorsky VS-300, equipped with pontoons for water landings and at once saw the advantages of helicopter-equipped search and rescue squadrons. Two early Sikorsky R-4s were acquired in 1941, and training was initiated at Coast Guard Station Brooklyn in New York.

In 1942, Royal Air Force and Royal Navy fliers trained in Brooklyn after which the British bought a large number of "hoverflies" from Sikorsky to re-organize 705 Naval Air Squadron. The first hoist lift rescue occurred on 29 November 1945, when a barge ran aground at Penfield Reef, off Fairfield, Connecticut, during heavy weather, very near to the Sikorsky facility in Bridgeport. Sikorsky chief pilot Jimmy Viner, along with USAAF Captain Jack Beighle flew a Sikorsky R-5 (S-48) to lift the two crew members using the hoist and deposit them safely ashore. The first military helicopter air-sea rescue was carried out in 1946 when a Sikorsky S-51 being demonstrated to the U.S. Navy was used in an emergency to pull a downed Navy pilot from the ocean.

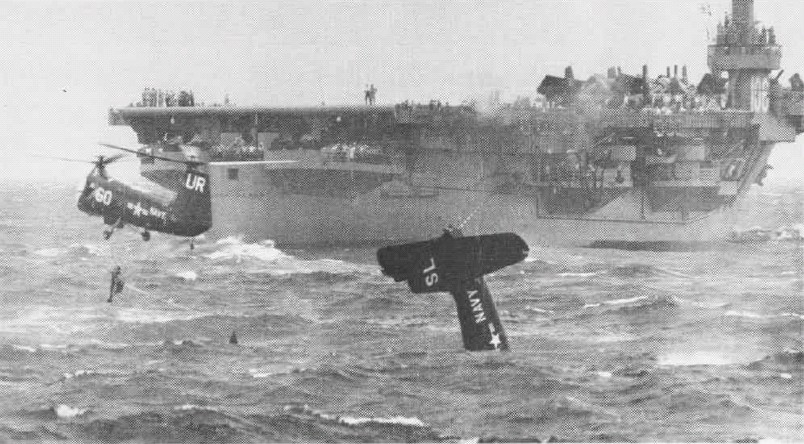
With the tail of his Grumman AF Guardian still visible, a U.S. Navy pilot who had been waved off his attempted landing aboard the escort carrier USS Block Island is hoisted from the water by a Piasecki HUP Retriever helicopter in 1953.

The first peacetime air-sea rescue squadron exclusively using helicopters was No. 275 Squadron RAF re-organized in 1953 at Linton-on-Ouse. The unit painted their Bristol Sycamore aircraft all yellow, with lettering on the side reading "RESCUE"—a paint scheme that has continued to the present.

In the 1950s, some models of helicopter such as the Bell 47 and 48 were fitted with pontoons so that they could rest on both water and land. Other helicopters, such as the Sea King and the Seaguard, were made with a water-resistant hull which allowed them to settle directly onto the water for long enough to effect a rescue. Such amphibious helicopters came to the fore during the 1960s, but have been largely replaced by helicopters unable to land on water, due to high aircraft development costs. Amphibious helicopters paid dividends for rescue personnel who enjoyed greater safety and success during operations. Operations that use non-amphibious helicopters rely to a higher degree on hoists, rescue baskets, and rescue swimmers.

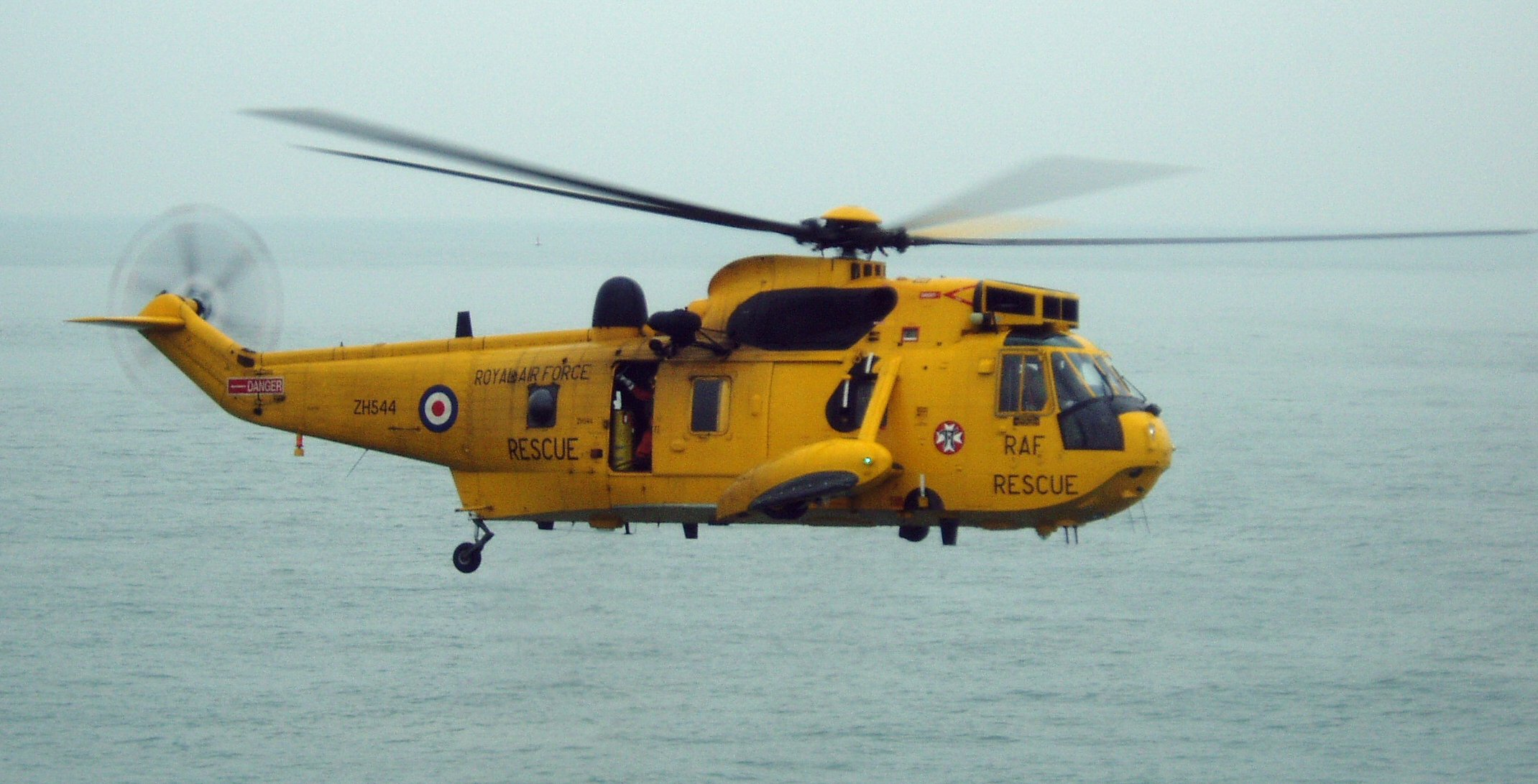
A Royal Air Force Westland Sea King air-sea rescue helicopter

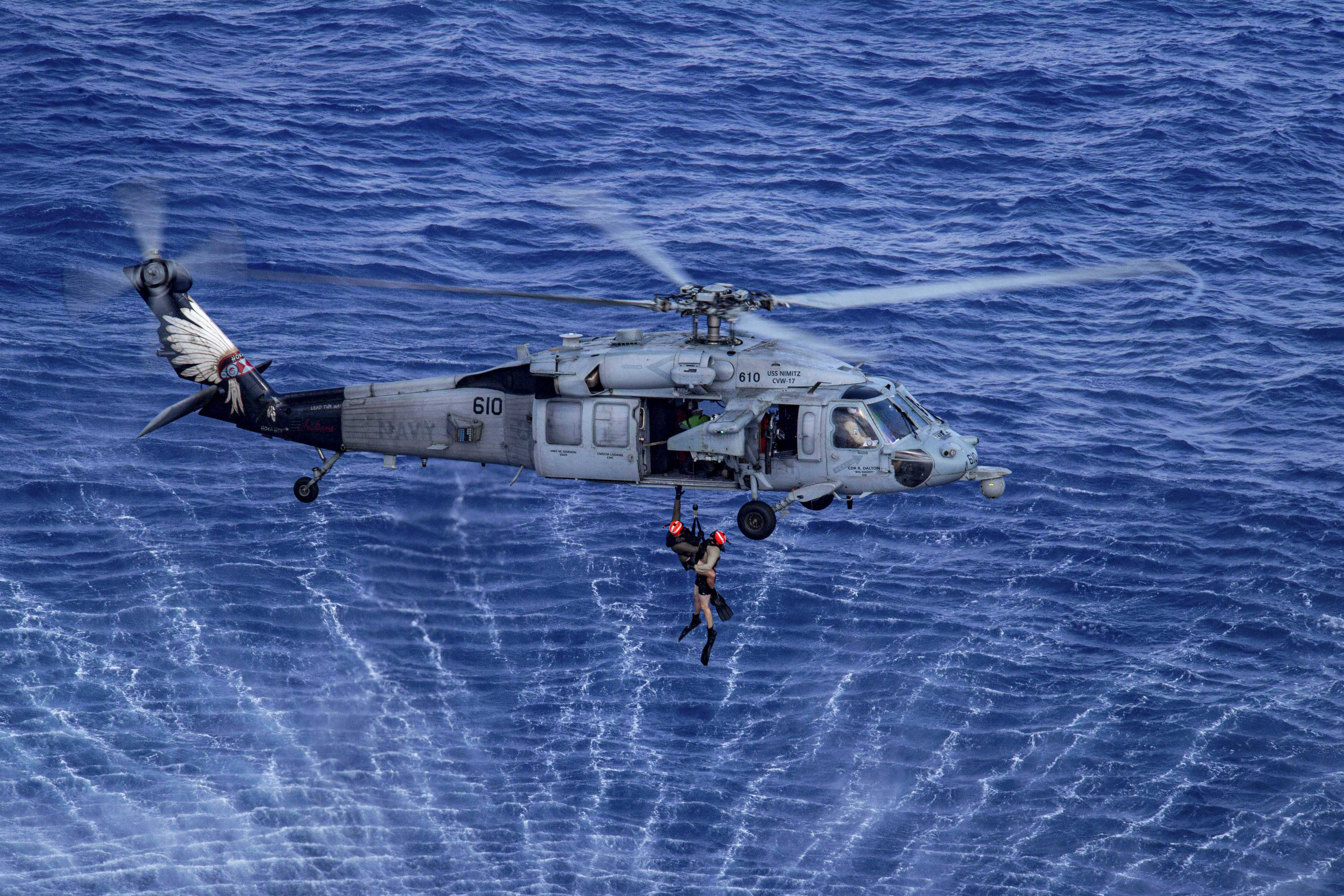
Search and rescue swimmers are lifted into an MH-60S Sea Hawk helicopter during training in the Philippine Sea, April 2025

Helicopters became frequently used, due to a number of advantages; they could fly in rougher weather than fixed-wing aircraft and could deliver injured passengers directly to hospitals or other emergency facilities. Helicopters can hover above the scene of an accident while fixed-wing aircraft must circle; and seaplanes must land and taxi toward the accident. Helicopters can save those stranded among rocks and reefs, where seaplanes are unable to go. Landing facilities for helicopters can be much smaller and cruder than for fixed-wing aircraft.

The same helicopter that is capable of air-sea rescue can take part in a wide variety of other operations, including those on land. Disadvantages include the loud noise causing difficulties in communicating with the survivors, and the strong downdraft that the hovering helicopter creates which increases wind chill danger for already-soaked and hypothermic patients. Helicopters also tend to have limited range and endurance.

=== Korean War ===
Toward the end of World War II, several B-29 bombers on each large-scale bombing mission were emptied of ammunition, filled with rescue supplies and rotated through Super Dumbo patrol duty as their squadron mates lumbered off filled with bombs. Following that conflict, 16 B-29 bombers were converted to full-time air–sea rescue duty and redesignated SB-29 Super Dumbo. The SB-29 served throughout the Korean War and into the mid-1950s. The SB-17 began serving in Korea, but dropped only a few lifeboats to save several lives before being phased out in late 1951—there were enough SB-29 Super Dumbos and Grumman SA-16A Albatross flying boats to satisfy the need.

Other air-sea rescue aircraft used in the Sea of Japan and the Yellow Sea include the PB-1G land-based maritime patrol bomber and the Sikorsky H-5 helicopter, and later the H-19. Rafts were often dropped which inflated upon impact with the water. Operating in coordination with the U.S. Navy, the USCG painted their air-sea rescue assets white.

Shortly after the Korean War, some Douglas C-54 Skymasters were converted to air-sea rescue work and redesignated SC-54; the type quickly replaced all of the remaining Flying Fortresses and Super Fortresses still in service. The SC-54 sometimes carried an airborne lifeboat and could carry more rescue supplies over longer distances.

=== Vietnam War ===
In the Vietnam War, American naval vessels and aircraft from both the U.S. Navy and the U.S. Air Force participated in air-sea rescue patrols in the Gulf of Tonkin. The helicopter most closely associated with long-range U.S. air-sea rescue operations in Southeast Asia was the Sikorsky S-61R, called the "Pelican" or "Jolly Green Giant", a variation of the SH-3 Sea King. First acquired by the U.S. Navy in 1961 for anti-submarine warfare, variants of the helicopter were quickly utilized for many duties including rescue, and were operated by the United States Air Force (USAF), which developed an in-flight refueling system.

In 1970, USAF Air Rescue and Recovery Service (ARRS) Sea Kings performed a Transatlantic flight from the U.S. to France using such refueling methods. At the same time as the Vietnam War, U.S. Navy helicopters were used during the Apollo space missions to pull astronauts and their capsules from the ocean.

=== Falklands War ===
Sixteen Westland Sea King SAR helicopters were in operation with the Royal Navy at the time of the 1982 Falklands War. SAR helicopters were assigned search and rescue patrols; both the Sea King and Westland Wessex rotorcraft repeatedly succeeded in plucked airmen from the icy waters. Helicopters were also used to transport troops and provide logistical support; on one occasion, they facilitated the rescue of Special Air Service (SAS) troops trapped on a glacier in heavy wind and snow conditions.

Two Royal Air Force SAR helicopters of No. 1564 Flight on detached duty continued to provide cover for the Falkland Islands until 2016. Since official records began in 1983, the Falklands SAR mission had reportedly responded to 1,305 callouts and given life-saving assistance to 1,883 people.

On the Argentine side, the Argentine Air Force used Bell 212 from the islands and the ad hoc unit Escuadrón Fénix from the mainland. The Argentine Army helicopters, in particular UH-1H, rescued several downed pilots as well, most notably Argentine Naval Aviation Lt Arca by Capt Jorge Svendsen who was decorated with the Valour in Combat Medal for this action.

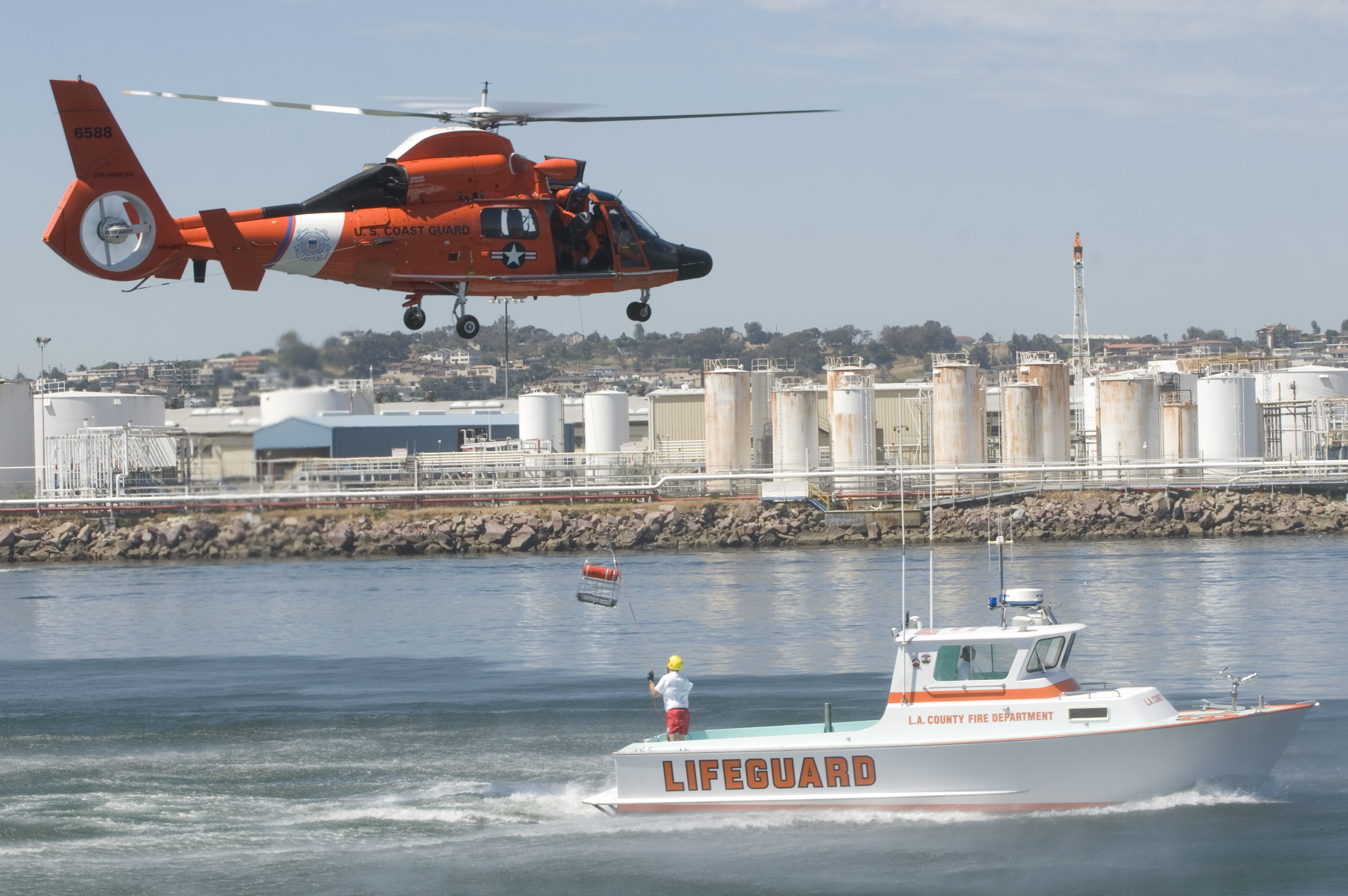
A United States Coast Guard Eurocopter HH-65 Dolphin Helicopter demonstrates interagency Military-Civilian operations with a Los Angeles County Fire Department Motor life boat

== Civilian operations ==
=== Chicago Fire Department ===
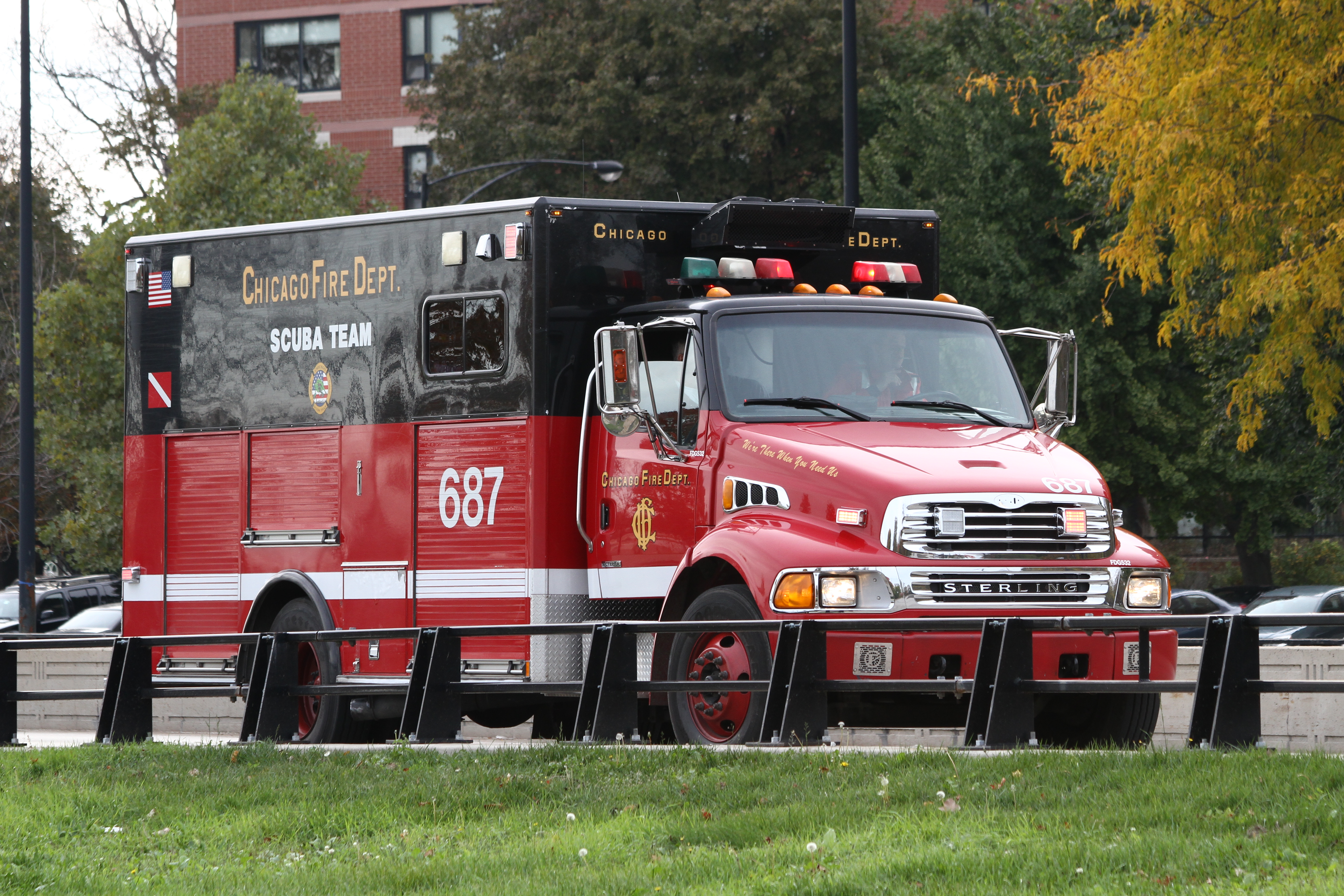
A Chicago Fire Department Scuba Team

The Chicago Fire Department formed an Air Rescue Helicopter unit in 1965 with two Bell 47Gs at Midway Airport and operated Air Rescue and Sea Rescue as separate units until 1979. Originally based at Midway Airport, CFD Air Rescue operated two Bell 47Gs. Later, the CFD flew a Bell UH-1 "Huey" and a Bell 206L-4. Currently, CFD Air Sea Rescue (ASR) operates two Bell 412EPs, with two pilots and two firefighters working as rescue divers.

The CFD operates a dive truck "Dive Team 687" and a fast response boat, the "Eugene Blackmon 688." CFD practices tethered, tender-directed dive search patterns, from shore or in-water. CFD ASR responded to 249 water rescue incidents in 2014, and its members logged over 3200 hours of training.

In a notable April 2008 incident, CFD ASR members rescued a three-year-old child who had been submerged in 42 degree water for approximately 15 minutes. After being resuscitated by EMS and at a paediatric trauma center, it was reported in August of that year that the child made a "complete recovery."

=== Government Flying Service ===
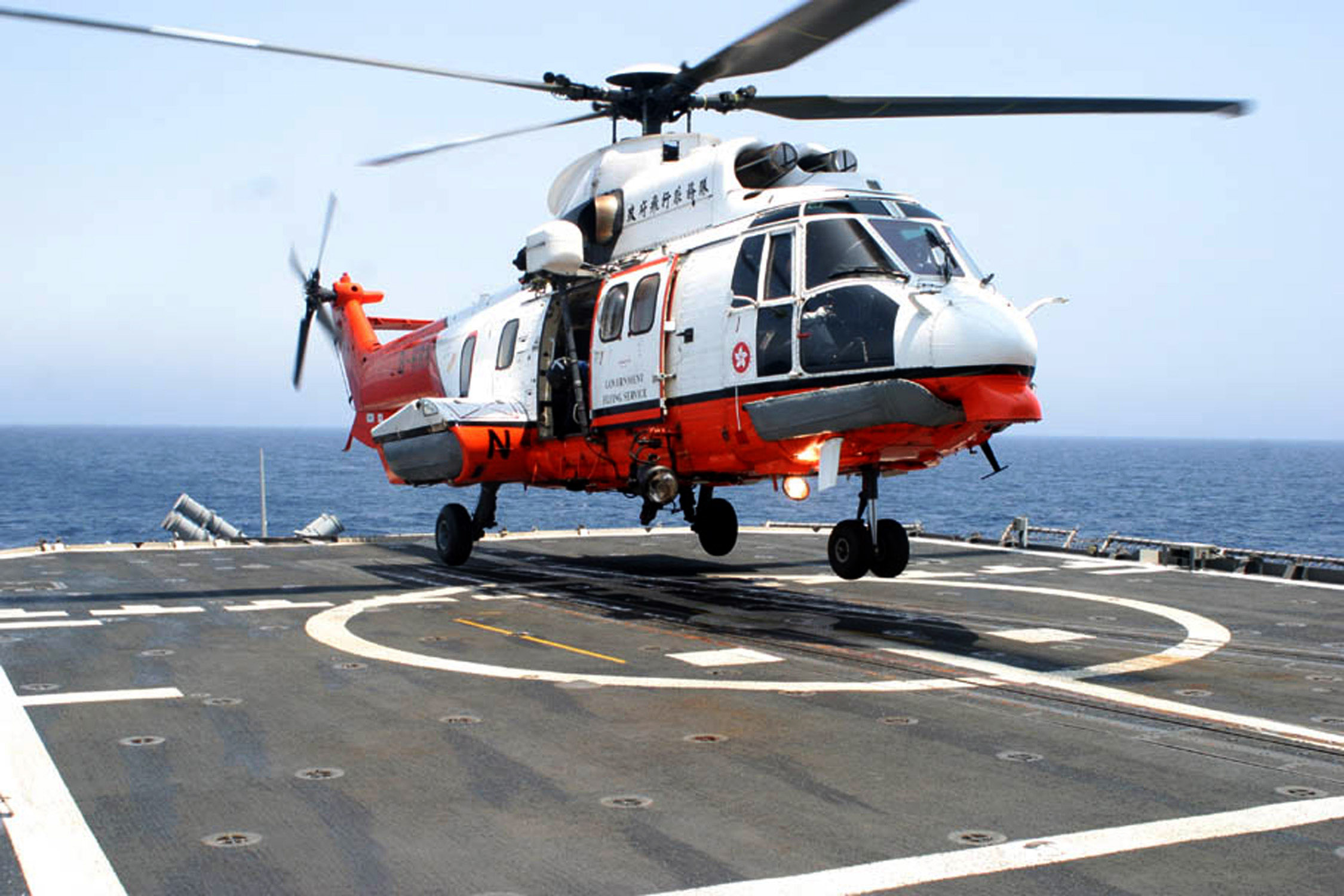
Hong Kong GFS AS332 L2 Super Puma SAR helicopter

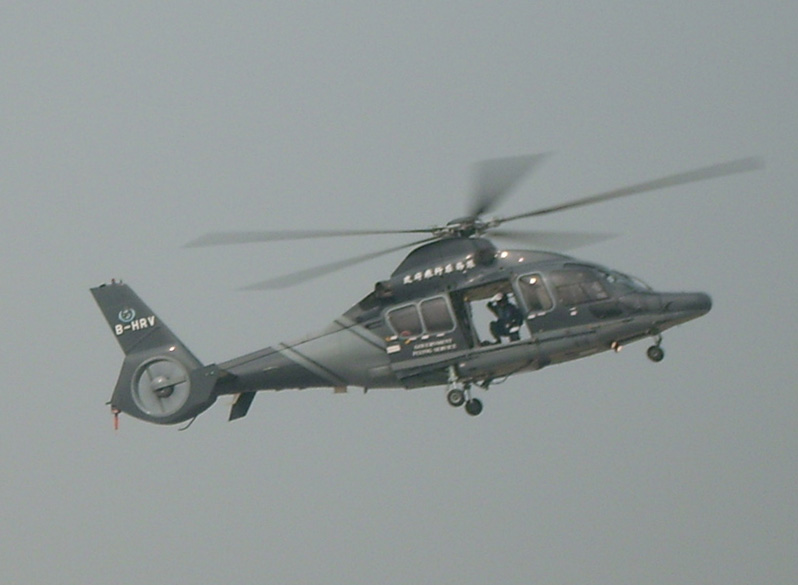
A HK GFS EC155 helicopter

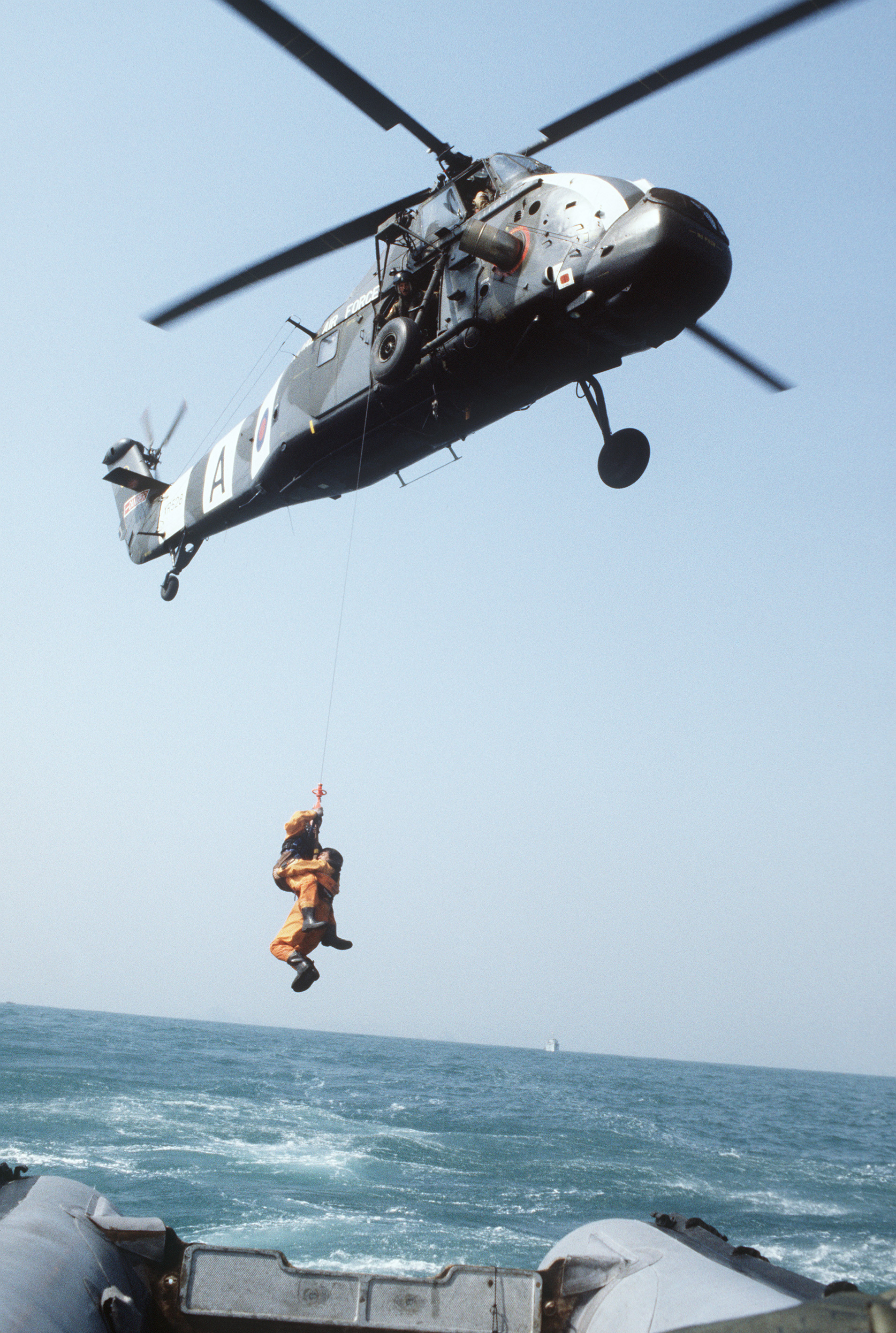
A Royal Air Force Westland Wessex HC2 SAR helicopter off Hong Kong

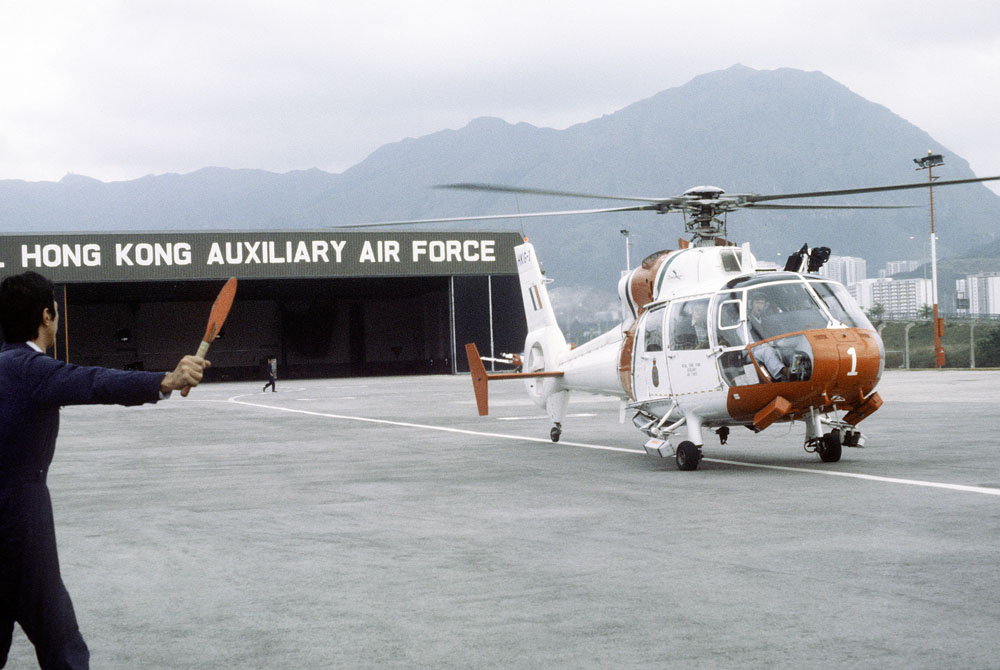
A Royal Hong Kong Auxiliary Air Force Aérospatiale SA 360 Dauphin SAR helicopter

Since 1993, the Government Flying Service (GFS) has provided air-sea rescue services; prior to this point, the Royal Hong Kong Auxiliary Air Force has been responsible for this. The GFS operates maritime SAR within the 400-nautical-mile (740 km) radius of the Hong Kong Flight Information Region (FIR). Air-sea rescue is provided by its fleet of seven Airbus Helicopters H175.

=== His Majesty's Coastguard ===
His Majesty's Coastguard are in charge of maritime search and rescue missions in the United Kingdom. The Coastguard is one of the four emergency services that can be contacted on 999. Their role is to initiate and coordinate the searches. Lifeboats are provided by volunteer agencies, most often by the Royal National Lifeboat Institution. Aircraft for an air-sea rescue were originally provided by the Royal Navy and Royal Air Force. Under the programme UK-SAR, they are now operated under contract by Bristow Helicopters.

=== Irish Coast Guard ===
The Irish Coast Guard (IRCG) has responsibility for the Irish Search and Rescue Region. It operates a number of contracted Sikorsky SAR helicopters from bases in Dublin, Waterford, Shannon and Sligo under the €500 million contract, from 2010, a previous fleet of Sikorsky S-61N helicopters were replaced with five newer Sikorsky S-92 helicopters. One of the new S-92 helicopters is located at each of the four IRCG bases, with one spare replacement aircraft being rotated between bases. In 2020, the IRCG are launching a tender for a future SAR Aviation Contract,

=== New York City Police Department ===
The New York Police Department has, since 1986, operated a coordinated air-sea rescue program based at Floyd Bennett Field, where scuba divers were stationed in shifts at a hangar containing helicopter rescue aircraft. The NYPD Aviation Unit operates night vision-equipped Bell 412 helicopters which fly to rescue locations carrying two pilots, one crew chief and two scuba divers. NYPD motor lifeboats from the Harbor Unit respond as well, meeting the helicopter at the incident site to pick up non-critically injured survivors who don't require air evacuation. After the January 2009 ditching of US Airways Flight 1549 in the Hudson River, NYPD air-sea rescue units pulled two survivors from the icy river and applied first aid for hypothermia, and divers swam through the submerged aircraft cabin to make certain all passengers were evacuated.

=== Westpac Lifesaver Rescue Helicopter Service ===
The Westpac Lifesaver Rescue Helicopter Service is active in Australia's southern and western regions, primarily provides helicopter-based near-shore activities. In Queensland, the Service patrols the southeast coast, performing beach patrols, search & rescue, shark sightings and warnings and assisting Surf Lifesavers in the water and on the beach, utilising (VH-NVG) a Eurocopter EC135.

== Rescue swimmer ==
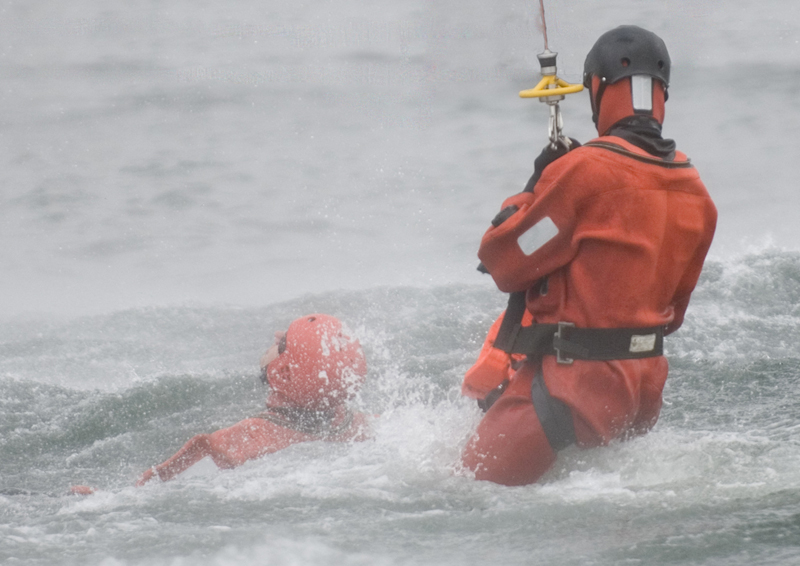
Royal Danish Navy rescue swimmers wearing dry suits and helmets

Rescue swimmers have been used for air-sea rescue work to assist in picking up survivors who are not able to reach the rescue craft, especially those incapacitated by exposure to cold water. Since the mid-1980s when standards were set down for their instruction and implementation, rescue swimmers have deployed from rescue helicopters or rescue boats and have been trained to extricate downed airmen from fouled parachute lines and ejection seats. Rescue swimmers must meet a number of difficult requirements: their physical conditioning must be kept at a high level, they must be expert in first aid treatment methods, and they are often highly trained technicians crucial to the operation of the rescue craft.

== See also ==
E.M.I.L.Y.

- Aviation Survival Technician
- Crash boats of World War II
