= Aviation Survival Technician =

United States Coast Guard rescue swimmer

- Rating insignia
- Issued by: United States Coast Guard
- Type: Enlisted rating
- Abbreviation: AST
- Specialty: Aviation

Aviation Survival Technician (AST) is a rating or job specialty in the United States Coast Guard. Rescue swimmer is the collateral duty or aircrew position of the AST. They are trained at the U.S. Coast Guard's enlisted Aviation Survival Technician/Rescue Swimmer school at United States Coast Guard Training Center Petaluma in Petaluma, California while Coast Guard Aviation Technical Training Center, Coast Guard Air Station Elizabeth City in Elizabeth City, North Carolina is renovated.

== History ==
The rating began in 1968 when the U.S. Coast Guard combined Parachute Rigger (PR) and Aviation Ordnanceman (AO) to create the Aviation Survivalman (ASM) Rating. In 1983, the disaster of the SS Marine Electric spawned a Congressional Inquiry that found the USCG was the only military service unable to deploy a member from an aircraft for search, rescue and recovery, and initiated a legal requirement for the armed force to do so. After much internal debate, the collateral duty of "Helicopter Rescue Swimmer" was issued to the ASM rating.

By June 1985, the Commandant formally announced that the ASM rating would be permanently redefined to include rescue swimmer and emergency medical technician (EMT) duties. To ensure fairness during the transition, chief petty officers and above were exempt from these new requirements. For all other ASMs, a generous transition period of over five years was provided. By July 1, 1990, these individuals were required to either qualify as rescue swimmers, transfer to a different rate, or face discharge.

Implementation plans for the rescue swimmer program were phased in over five years, with the goal of assigning a trained rescue swimmer to each duty section. This expansion included additional personnel billets to accommodate on-the-job training and recurring qualification requirements. Despite initial resistance, the Aviation Survival Technician (AST)—evolving from the ASM rating—has become an integral and enduring component of Coast Guard rotary-wing operations.

Initially, all new ASMs were required to complete US Navy Helicopter Rescue Swimmer school at Naval Air Station Pensacola, Florida, prior to reporting to USCG ASM "A" School and EMT "C" School. After a few years, the differences between what the candidates were learning in the combat-oriented Navy school and what was being required of them during civilian rescues required an organic Coast Guard helicopter rescue swimmer school to be begun. An aquatic segment of training was merged into ASM "A" school in the late 1980s, and full initial rescue swimmer training was completed at the USCG's Elizabeth City training center.

Air Station Elizabeth City was selected in 1985 to spearhead the implementation of the Coast Guard Helicopter Rescue Swimmer program. It took six years to expand the program to a robust force of 300 rescue swimmers, ensuring every duty section across all air stations had qualified personnel. Air Station San Francisco, operating HH-52A helicopters, became the second station to implement the program in November 1985. This was followed by Air Station Astoria, Oregon, in January 1986, and Air Station Clearwater, Florida, in August 1986. San Francisco’s HH-3F helicopters joined the program later that same year, alongside Air Station Sitka, Alaska, in November 1986.

The program prioritized implementation at stations with the highest risk of cold-water incidents, where individuals in distress faced the most severe peril. Locations with proximity to frigid waters, such as Alaska and the Pacific Northwest, were among the first to adopt the program. Conversely, stations in warmer climates, including Puerto Rico, Hawaii, and Miami, were among the last to integrate rescue swimmers into their operations.

In 1999, along with the realignment of enlisted aviation rates throughout the USCG, the Aviation Survivalman rating was redesignated to Aviation Survival Technician.

In 2014, a state of the art training center was opened under the command of the Aviation Technical Training Center aboard BASE Elizabeth City, NC and houses AST "A" School as well as Underwater Egress "C" School.

== Training and qualification ==
The course is 24 weeks long. The course includes instruction on rescue techniques, helicopter deployment techniques, and myriad technical skills from small engine repair to parachute packing and maintenance. Successful completion of this course results in being awarded the Aviation Survival Technician rating, the technical rating for a variety of aircraft and survival equipment maintenance.

After completion of A-School, all ASTs are sent to Training Center Petaluma, California to attend the Coast Guard's Emergency Medical Technician school. After seven weeks of EMT training, they must take and pass the National Registry of Emergency Medical Technicians-Basic (NREMT-B) test as part of their qualification as a helicopter rescue swimmer.

Full qualification as a rescue swimmer can take up to a year from graduation of A-School, as graduates must learn the aircraft systems and emergency procedures of their assigned aircraft.

Not all ASTs serve as rotary wing helicopter rescue swimmers. Many serve in other roles, including as aircrew on fixed-wing assets, at Coast Guard fire departments and as instructors at any of the various training commands.

== Pop culture ==
In the 1986 movie Top Gun, a United States Coast Guard Sikorsky S-61R deploys a rescue swimmer to rescue Maverick and Goose. This rescue swimmer was either an AST or the AST predecessor; an Aviation Survivalman.

The 2006 movie The Guardian featured Kevin Costner and Ashton Kutcher as well as a number of actual ASTs and Coast Guardsmen as extras, and told a fictional story of two rescue swimmers.

In 2019, the Amazon Prime reboot of Jack Ryan featured a helicopter rescue swimmer in the pilot episode.

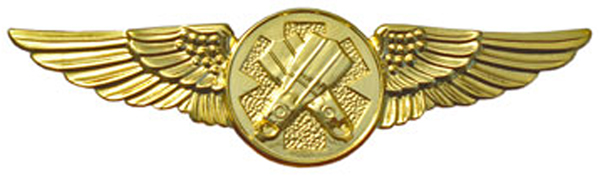
Rescue Swimmer Wings

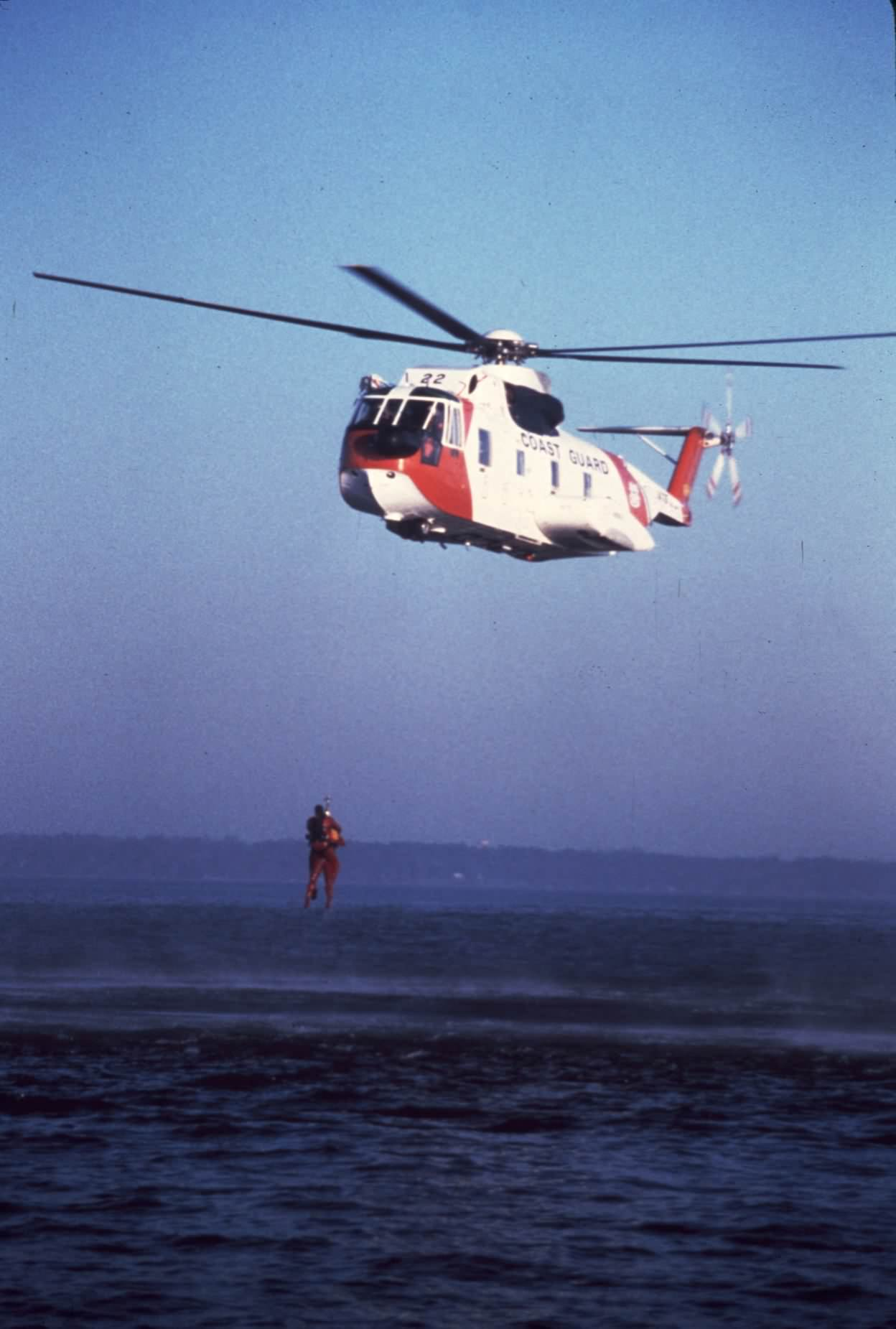
U.S. Coast Guard HH-3F Pelican hoists a swimmer, the first helicopter used for rescue swimming.

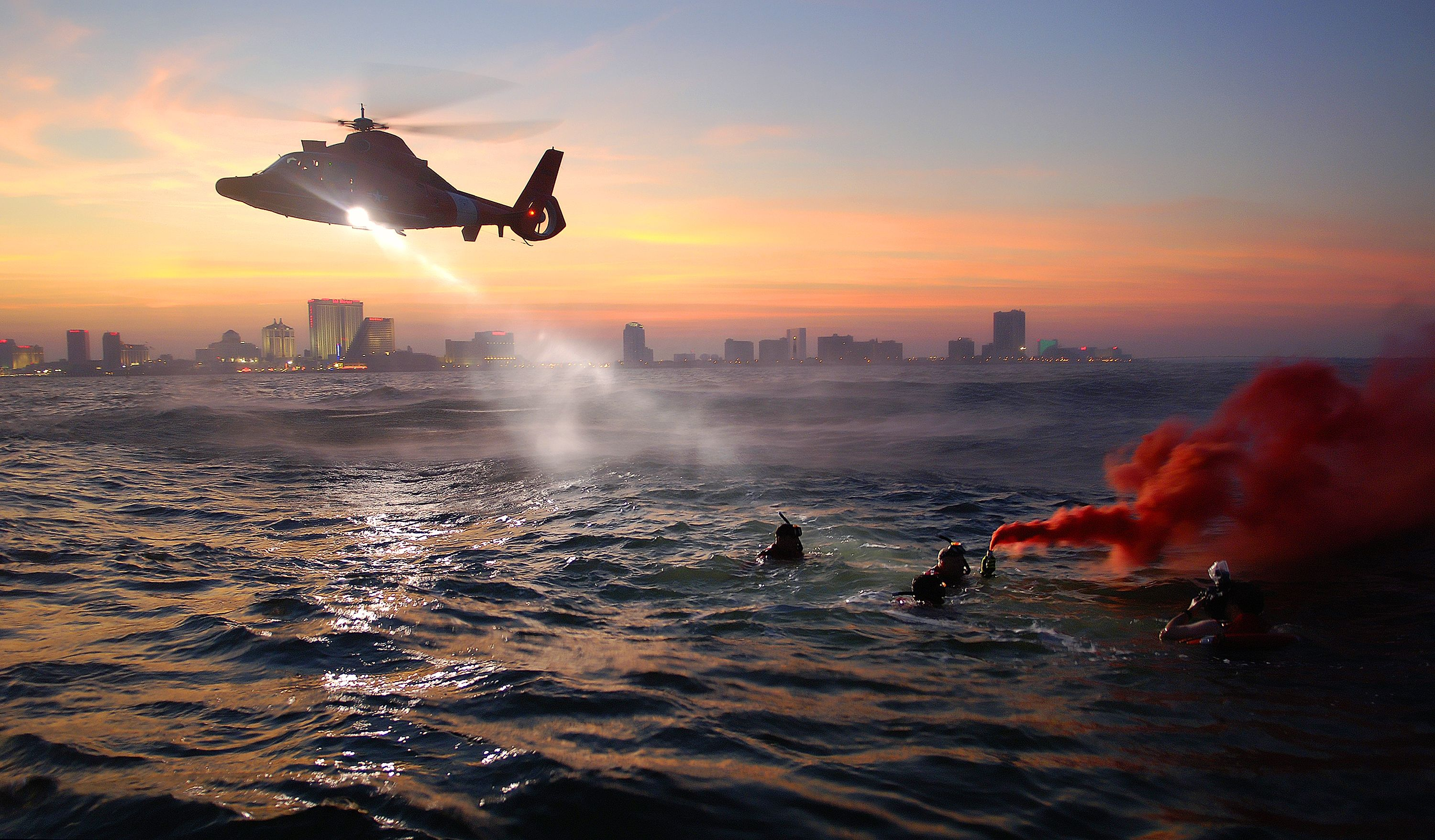
Coast Guard rescue swimmers from Coast Guard Air Station Atlantic City train off the coast of Atlantic City, New Jersey.

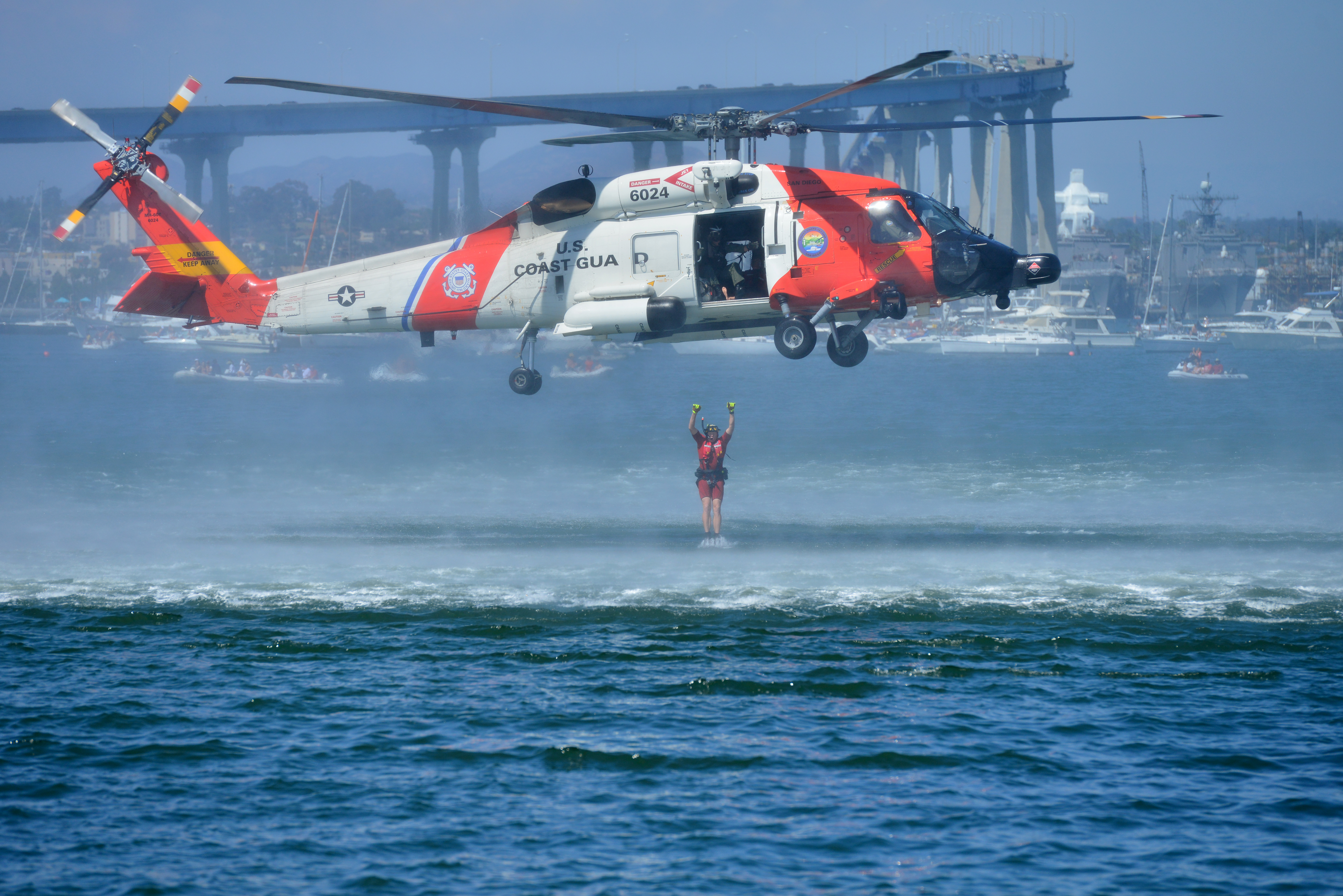
AST demonstrating a rescue.

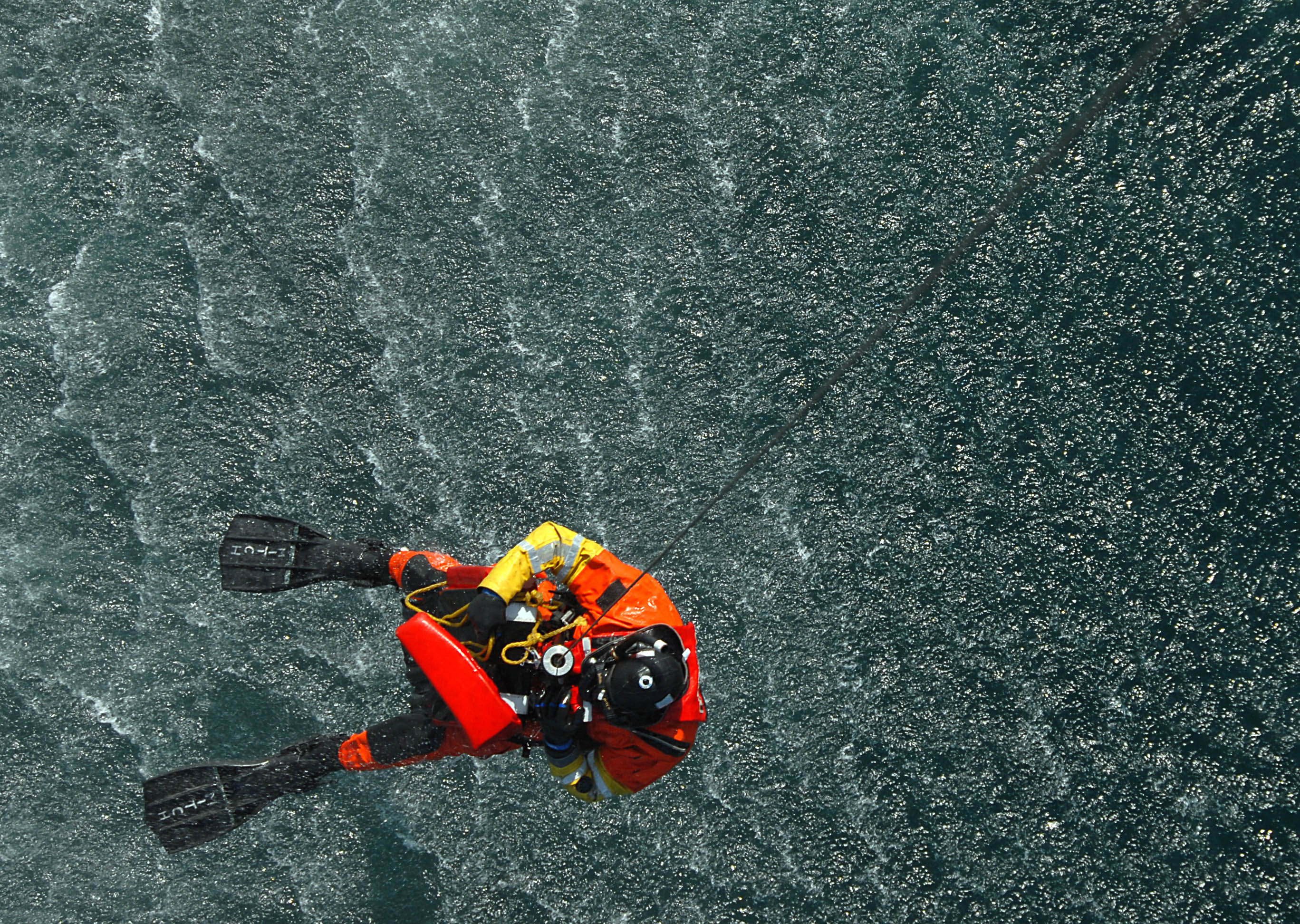
A rescue swimmer from Coast Guard Air Station Cape Cod, Massachusetts, is hoisted back into an HH-60 Jayhawk after retrieving a rescue training dummy.

== See also ==
- Air-sea rescue
- Naval aircrewman
- United States Air Force Pararescue
- Parachute Rigger
- Aviation Ordnanceman
- E.M.I.L.Y.

== Sources ==
- LaGuardia-Kotite, Martha J. (2006). So Others May Live. USA: The Lyons Press. ISBN 978-1-59921-159-6.
