= Naval aircrewman =

General rating of the US Navy

Naval Aircrewman
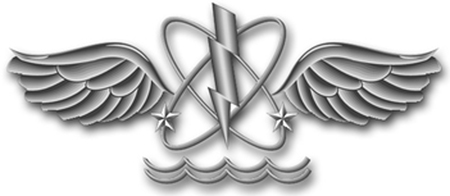
- Naval Air Crewman (NAC) Rating Badge
- Issued by: United States Navy
- Type: Enlisted rating
- Abbreviation: NAC

Naval aircrewman (NAC) is an enlisted general rating of the U.S. Navy. Sailors in NAC ratings serve as aircraft systems operators or inflight system maintenance technicians aboard U.S. Navy fixed and rotary winged aircraft. They perform duties as varied as aerial gunners, rescue swimmers, radar and sonar operators, airborne mine countermeasures system operators, strategic communications systems specialists, loadmasters, repair technicians, and various other functions depending on the specific aircraft type in which they fly. The rating is divided into five subdivisions termed "service ratings". Those service ratings are: Naval Aircrewman Operator (AWO); Naval Aircrewman Helicopter (AWS); Naval Aircrewman Tactical Helicopter (AWR); Naval Aircrewman Mechanical (AWF); and Naval Aircrewman Avionics (AWV). All five service ratings are identified by a single AW Rating Badge. Many technologically advanced navies have a similar trade.

== History of the AW Rating ==
The AW rating was originally established on 1 Sep 1968 by BuPers Note 1440 of 29 Feb 1968 as the "Aviation Antisubmarine Warfare Operator" rating (abbreviated AW). It identified those Sailors whose job it was to operate radar, sonar and other submarine detection systems installed in the Navy's submarine hunting fixed and rotary winged aircraft of the time. In 1993 the rating name was changed to "Aviation Warfare Systems Operator" (without changing the AW abbreviation) by BuPers Note 1440 of 16 Nov 1993. The change in the rating's name reflected the expanded scope of the duties performed by AW Sailors who were by then flying in newer, more multi-mission aircraft and were performing, depending on the specific aircraft type, anti-surface warfare, combat search and rescue and/or naval special warfare support missions in addition to their traditional antisubmarine warfare functions.

In addition to Sailors in the AW rating, other Sailors primarily in aircraft maintenance ratings had been flying as crewmen aboard the Navy's various fixed and rotary winged utility, cargo or special mission aircraft performing airborne mine countermeasures, logistics, communications relay, airborne repair or maintenance of critical systems, flight engineer, loadmaster or other specialized functions.

On 2 May of 2005, NAVADMIN 092/05 titled "Helicopter Enlisted Naval Aircrew Rating Consolidation" was released which directed the consolidation of all helicopter aircrewmen in maintenance ratings (those holding Navy Enlisted Classifications (NEC) of 78xx and 94xx) into the Aviation Warfare Systems Operator (AW) rating thereby bringing all helicopter aircrewmen into the AW rating.

On 30 May of 2008, NAVADMIN 153/08 titled "Enlisted Naval Aircrew (NAC) Rating Consolidation" was released which brought about major changes to the AW rating. It changed the name of the AW rating from "Aviation Warfare Systems Operator" to "Naval Aircrewman" (while retaining the AW abbreviation); it converted all remaining aircrewmen with maintenance ratings to the AW rating (NAVADMIN 092/05 had previously converted all helicopter aircrewmen to the AW rating, but it had not converted the fixed wing maintenance rating crewmen to AW); and it subdivided the AW rating into five "service ratings." Those five service ratings being: Naval Aircrewman Operator (AWO); Naval Aircrewman Helicopter (AWS); Naval Aircrewman Tactical Helicopter (AWR); Naval Aircrewman Mechanical (AWF); and Naval Aircrewman Avionics (AWV).

== Naval Aircrew Warfare Specialist ==
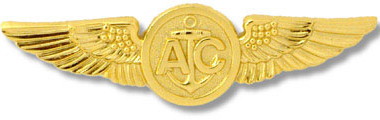
Naval Aircrew Warfare Specialist

Naval Aircrewmen are easily identified by the Gold Wings which they wear which are similar to the wings of Naval Aviators who pilot the aircraft and of Naval Flight Officers who along with the Naval Aircrewmen perform the critical non-pilot functions which are essential to operating and employing naval aircraft. These Gold Wings are earned after an AW completes his or her training pipeline and reports to his or her first operational squadron. Within 18 months of arrival in the squadron the new Naval Aircrewman is required to earn qualification as a "Naval Aircrew Warfare Specialist" (NAC). The qualification is earned through a training program in the squadron during which he or she is required to learn and demonstrate the knowledge and abilities required to operate and employ naval aircraft in the missions or tasks assigned.

Upon satisfactory completion of the program and demonstration of the required knowledge by sitting for a qualification board of the squadrons leaders, the new AW is awarded the Gold Naval Aircrew Warfare Specialist "Wings" and the designation "NAC" is added to the Sailor's title or rate in the following manner "AWO2(NAC) John Smith." When spoken the designation "NAC" is spoken "Aircrew Warfare so "AWO2(NAC) John Smith" is spoken "Naval Aircrewman Operator Second Class, Aircrew Warfare, John Smith.

Prior to the change in the name of the AW rating from "Aviation Warfare Systems Operator" to the current name "Naval Aircrewman", these Gold Wings were called "Naval Aircrew" Wings and the designation "(NAC)" was spoken "Naval Aircrew".

Following is an example of the change in the names of the rating and the wings:
-Prior to the changes: AW2(NAC) John Smith, spoken as "Aviation Warfare Systems Operator 2nd Class, Naval Aircrew, John Smith.
-After the changes: AWS2(NAC) John Smith, spoken as "Naval Aircrewman Helicopter 2nd Class, Aircrew Warfare, John Smith.

== Training ==
All AWs must attain a minimum amount of education and training in several fields of science, technology, and aviation at several different schools. The educational "pipeline" averages 18 months to 2 years in length. The following list describes most of those schools:

=== Schools ===
==== Naval Aircrew Candidate School (NACCS) ====
Naval Aircrew Candidate School (NACCS), at NAS Pensacola, Florida, trains and evaluates AW students in basic flight physiology and water survival. The course includes low-pressure hypobaric chamber training, night-vision evaluations, multi-station spatial-disorientation device (also known as the "spin and puke") training, and aircraft-emergency-water-egress device. The curriculum also includes advanced first aid and CPR and physical training with road runs up to 3-6 miles and one-mile swims.

==== AW “A” School ====
Naval Air Technical Training Center (NATTC) provides accession students a basic introduction to the fundamentals the student must be well versed in to operate on their prospective platform. Active and passive electronic warfare, active and passive sonar. Reading sonograms, magnetic anomaly detection equipment, physics, wave propagation, oceanography, meteorology and working with classified information are included in this phase of training.

==== Survival, Evasion, Resistance and Escape (SERE) ====
The Survival, Evasion, Resistance and Escape (SERE) course is designed to provide Level "C" Code of Conduct training to pilots, flight officers, intelligence officers, aircrew, and other designated high-risk-of-capture personnel, as directed by respective TYCOMs/MCCDC in accordance with DOD Instruction 1300.21 and the Joint Personnel Recovery Agency (JPRA) executive agent instruction. Training encompasses those basic skills necessary for worldwide survival, facilitating search-and-rescue efforts, evading capture by hostile forces, resistance to interrogation, exploitation, and indoctrination, and escape from detention by enemy forces, in accordance with DOD Instruction 1300.21. It is based on and reinforces the values expressed in the code of conduct while maintaining an appropriate balance of sound educational methodology and realistic/stressful training scenarios.

Participation in SERE training requires certification of a current physical examination (within 1 year for aircrew) and completion of a medical-screening form within 14 days of training by competent medical authority (i.e., flight surgeon, IDC). If students report for training without medical and dental records, they are dis-enrolled from the course. Because SERE training is physically demanding, students must comply with their own service's body fat standards and have successfully passed their most recent physical-readiness test.

==== Fleet Replacement Aircrew Training (FRAC) ====
This phase of training immerses the student much further into training for their specific platform and specialty. Typically, the student will report to an East Coast or West Coast Fleet Replacement Squadron (FRS) to conduct training. Naval Air Training and Operating Procedures Standardization (NATOPS) and tactics are also introduced. After completion of training and reporting for duty in the fleet, they are required to complete “on the job training” lasting around six months before being recognized as fully qualified.

== Position summaries ==
There are several platforms (fixed wing P-3 Orion and rotary wing MH-60R/S aircraft, aircraft carriers, etc.) specialties and special certifications available within the rating. Additional training can be acquired to qualify rotary wing AWs as Combat Search and Rescue(CSAR) crewman. Below is a list of specialties within the rating.

=== Aviation Rescue Swimmer (AIRR) ===
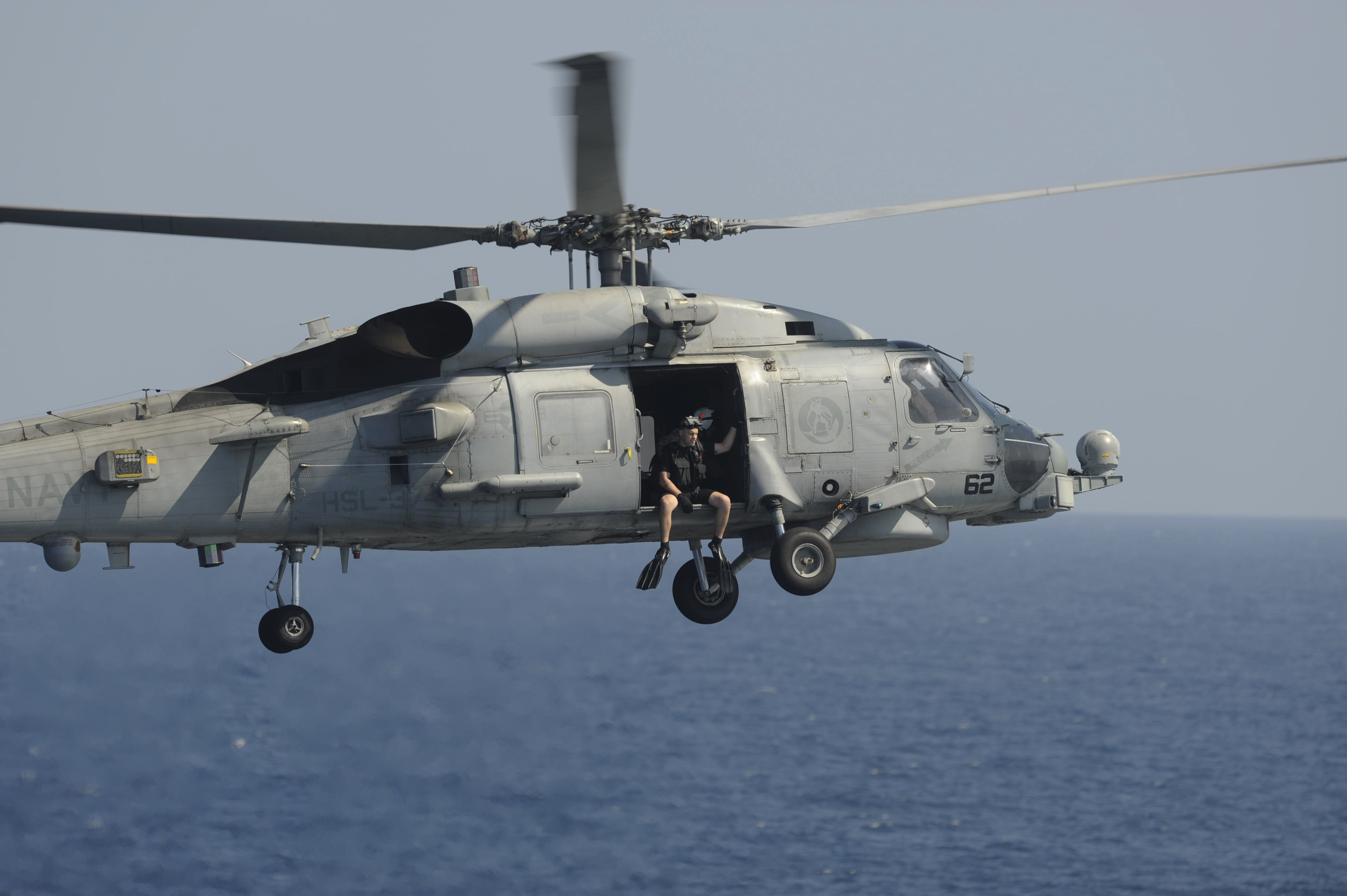
AIRR getting ready to splash

(abbreviated as AWS/AWR)

These Aircrewmen have successfully completed Aviation Rescue Swimmer School (ARSS) in Pensacola, Florida along with the multiple schools in the training pipeline. According to multiple sources, the average pipeline graduation rate is 22%. Sailors who choose this career path need to possess above-average maturity and the ability to stay calm in high-stress situations. AIRR's are trained in basic emergency medicine, rappelling, and various other skills other AW's will not receive. They share many similarities to Coast Guard Aviation Survival Technicians. They are often utilized in humanitarian, combat, and peacetime missions. On average, with both the pipeline and required on-the-job training, it takes about two years to become a qualified AIRR. The training pipeline is as follows:

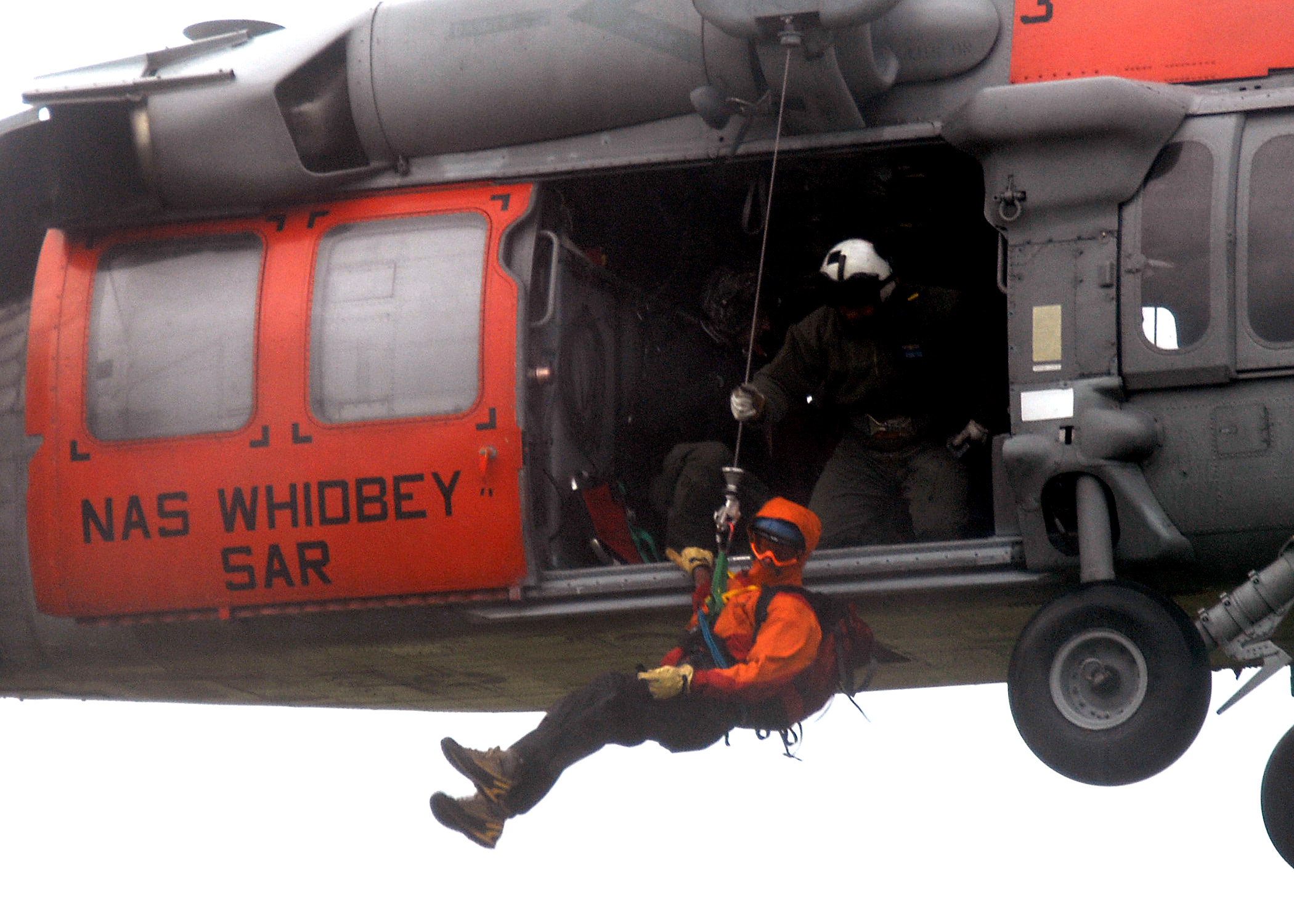
AIRR performing a mountain rescue

1. Aircrew Candidate School (3 weeks)
2. Rescue Swimmer School (5 weeks)
3. "A" School (7 weeks for AWS, 14 weeks for AWR)
4. SERE (2 weeks)
5. Fleet Replacement Squadrons (6-12 months at assigned Air Station)

=== AIRR Tactical Helicopter ===
(abbreviated as AWR)

AWRs go through NACCS and Rescue Swimmer Schools as well, then split off into their own pipeline from there. Going to A-School (13 weeks), FRAC(about 1 year long), SERE (2 weeks). AWRs perform the same jobs as regular AIRR crewman (AWS) as well as locating submarines using acoustics sensors, which has earned them the nickname "Subhunters". They also perform various Surface Warfare missions using Radar and other sensors on board the aircraft.

=== C-2A Loadmaster ===
These AWFs fly on the C-2A Greyhound, a carrier-based fixed-wing aircraft. They fly high priority passengers, cargo, and mail to and from aircraft carriers. Their designations as loadmasters start from FRAC school at VAW-120 in Norfolk, Virginia where they become transport second crewman. From there these AWs complete on the job training, their NAWS package, and a second crewman board to become carrier transport second crewman. And then finally completing more job specific qualifications to become a carrier transport crew chief. These AWF's are also highly skilled and qualified in the maintenance program and work hand in hand with their maintenance work centers to better improve their knowledge of the aircraft.

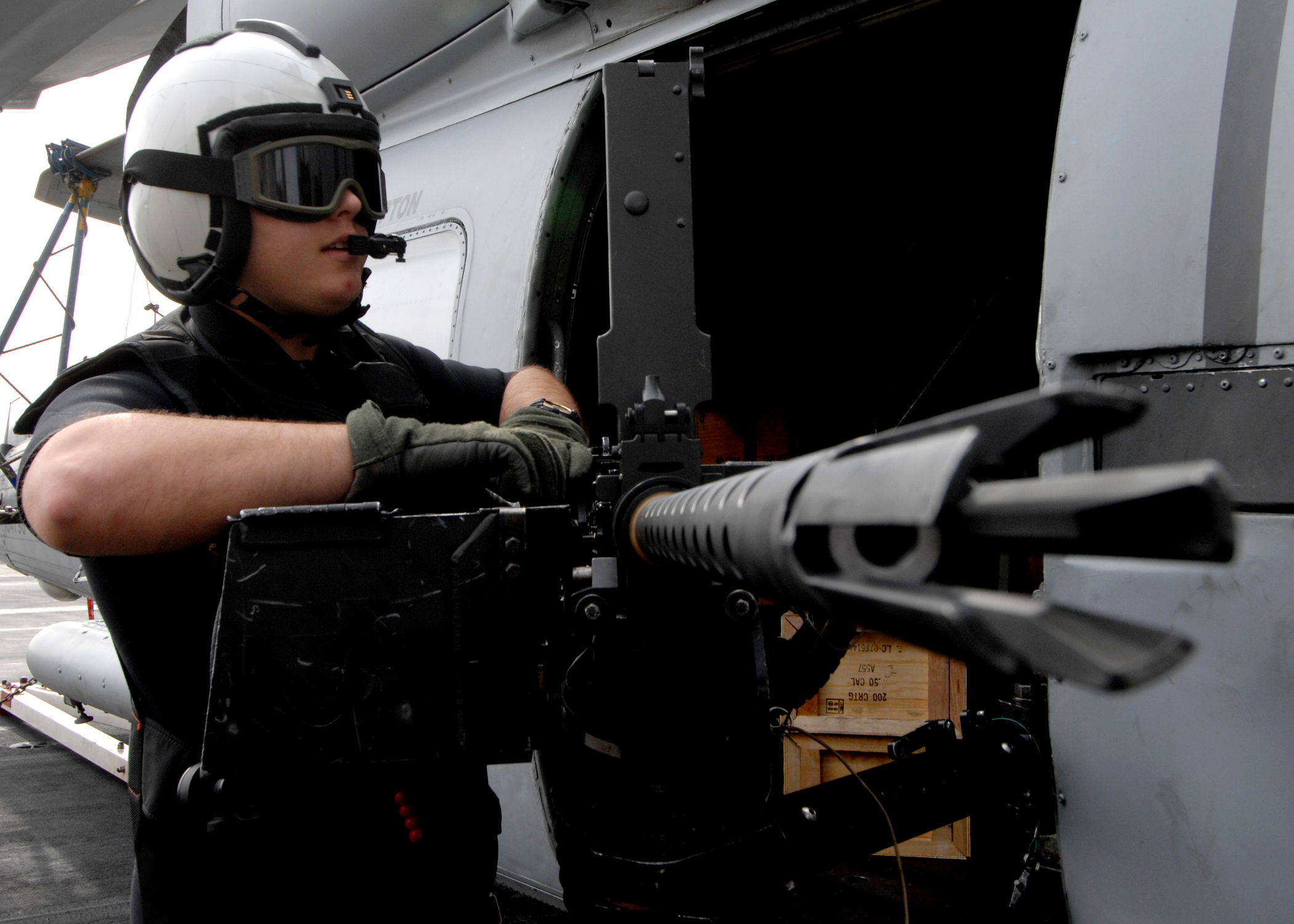
An AW performs maintenance on a .50-caliber crew-served weapon aboard the aircraft carrier USS Dwight D. Eisenhower

=== Naval Aircrewman (operator) ===
Aboard aircraft

Note: abbreviated as AWO, SS1, & SS2

These AWs fly in a fixed wing, long range patrol aircraft. Currently the P-3 Orion is fulfilling this role, with the P-8 Poseidon planned to take over this mission starting in 2013. Acoustic sensor operators begin their career in the fleet after attending specialized training. They start as sensor operator 2, and after sufficient flight and related experience is acquired, advance to sensor operator 1 with their own crew. The job can be related to the civilian fields of machine condition monitoring, or predictive maintenance. The AW is responsible for the analysis of all sensor data and must interpret this data in order to search for, localize and track, determine spatial orientation and vector, identify, assess condition of, establish attack parameters on a single, or multiple surface or subsurface contacts. These systems include but are not limited to passive sonar used to listen to underwater sounds, active sonar systems which can be used to pinpoint targets. They control the type and settings for the sonobuoys, underwater communication equipment for platform to platform communication, sensor system to fire control system data transfer and recording.

Aboard aircraft
Note: abbreviated as AWO, SS3

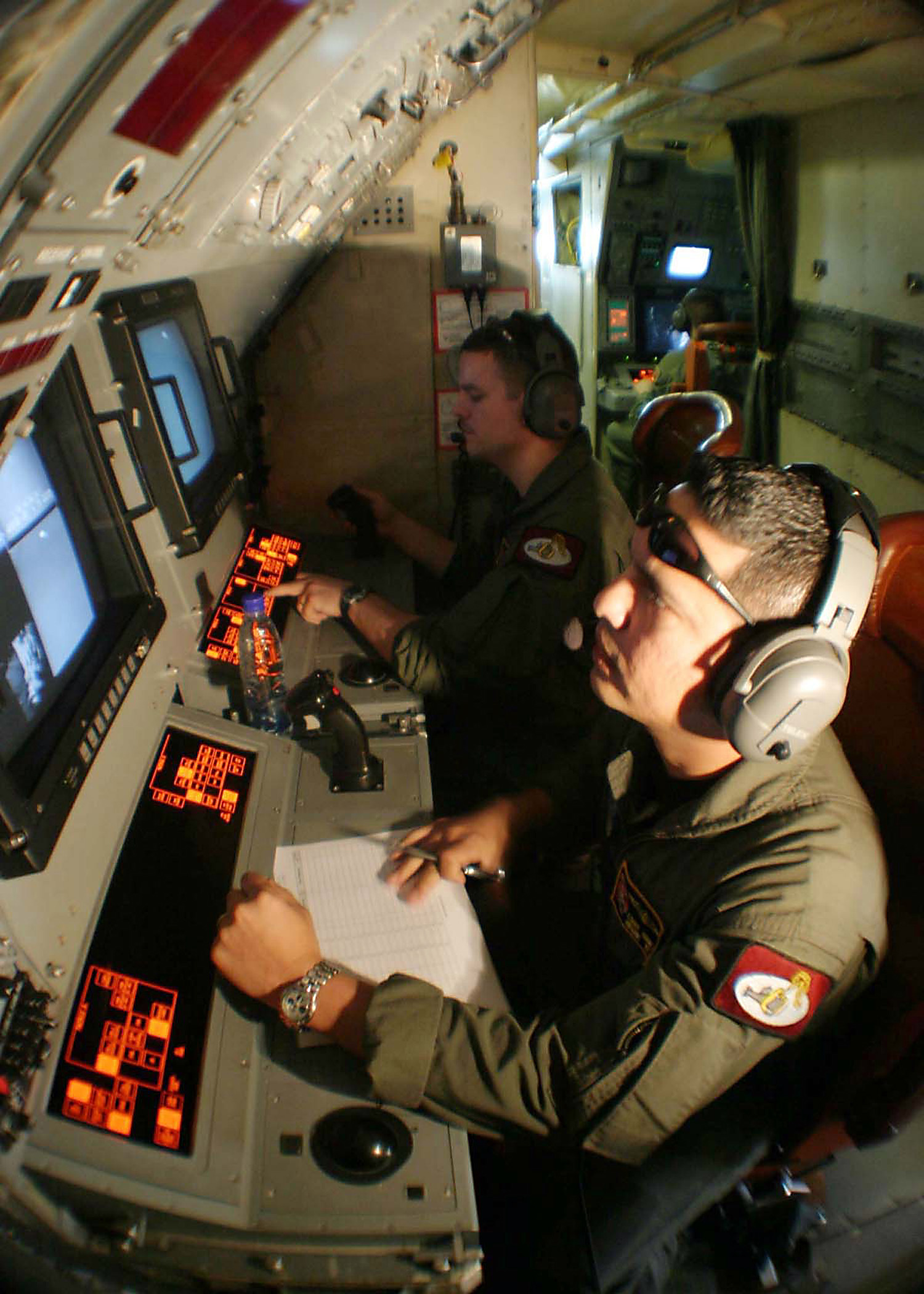
Aviation warfare systems operators monitor the acoustic station during the flight of a P-3C Orion

Non-acoustic AWs, also known as "sensor 3s" or electronic warfare operators, (EWO's), currently fly in P-3 Orion aircraft, they will be transitioning to the P-8A Poseidon beginning in 2013. Non-acoustic AWs are responsible for operating the radar, electronic support measures system, electro-optical/infrared imaging devices and magnetic anomaly detection device aboard variants of the P-3 Orion. They acquire data necessary to identify surface or air contacts, and can also provide data to help search, localize, and track contacts of interest. SS3s aid in establishing attack parameters on a single, or multiple surface contact. Non-acoustic operators also work with the flight station and navigator to ensure safety-of-flight conditions are maintained.

Aboard ship or on land
Note: abbreviated as ASWMOD/ASWOC

These AWs brief and debrief aircrews, filter through, organize, and relay intelligence collected during the mission in an aircraft carrier ASW module (ASMOD) or in a land-based ASW operations center (ASWOC). They coordinate ASW information-gathering throughout the battle group, operate various under-sea warfare and non-under-sea warfare related sensor systems to extract, analyze and classify data obtained; perform specified pre-flight, in-flight and post-flight operations in a multitude of naval aircraft serving anti-surface, USW, mine countermeasures, electronic, counter-narcotics, and land and sea rescue missions performance; operate tactical support center systems to analyze and classify USW and non-USW data; assist in aircrew briefing and debriefing; and provide data base information to the tactical commander for use in prescribing mission objectives and tactics.

=== Previous platforms ===
Past AW-crewed aircraft include aircraft carrier-based S-3 Viking and S-2 Tracker aircraft. They also flew in SH-3 Sea King and SH-2 Seasprite helicopters and P-2 Neptune patrol aircraft.

== See also ==
- List of United States Navy ratings
