= Air Force Rescue Coordination Center (United States) =

As the United States' inland search and rescue (SAR) coordinator, the Air Force Rescue Coordination Center (AFRCC) serves as the single agency responsible for coordinating on-land federal SAR activities in the United States, including Puerto Rico and U.S. Virgin Islands.

Some of the AFRCC's more notable missions include the search for John F. Kennedy Jr., the Payne Stewart mishap, the 11 September terrorist attacks, the Space Shuttle Columbia crash and, more recently, the search for world-record setting adventurer Steve Fossett.

== Location ==
Located at Tyndall Air Force Base, Florida, the AFRCC operates 24 hours a day, seven days a week. The center directly ties into the Federal Aviation Administration's alerting system and the United States Mission Control Center.

== Mission ==
In addition to the Search and Rescue Satellite Aided Tracking information, the AFRCC computer system contains resource files that list federal and state organizations, which can conduct or assist in SAR efforts throughout North America. When a distress call is received, the center investigates the request, coordinates with federal, state, and local officials, and determines the type and scope of response necessary. Once verified as an actual distress situation, the AFRCC requests support from the appropriate federal SAR force. This may include Civil Air Patrol, United States Coast Guard, or other Department of Defense assets, as needed. State agencies can be contacted for state, local, or civil SAR resource assistance within their jurisdiction. The AFRCC chooses the rescue force based on availability and capability of forces, geographic location, terrain, weather conditions, and urgency of the situation.

During ongoing SAR missions, the center serves as the communications hub and provides coordination and assistance to on-scene commanders or mission coordinators in order to recover the mission's objective in the safest and most effective manner possible. AFRCC uses state-of-the-art technology including a network of satellites for monitoring emergency locator transmitter signals. Systems such as these help reduce the critical time required to locate and recover people in distress. The AFRCC also formulates and manages SAR plans, agreements and policies throughout the continental United States. Additionally, it presents a mobile Search Management Course to Civil Air Patrol wings throughout the United States, to produce qualified incident commanders thus improving national SAR capability.

The AFRCC also assigns instructors to the National SAR School at the United States Coast Guard Training Center, Yorktown, Virginia The instructors teach the Inland Search and Rescue Class throughout the United States and at many worldwide military locations. This joint school is designed for civilian and military personnel from federal, state, local and volunteer organizations, all of who are responsible for SAR mission planning. Search and rescue missions include a variety of missions: searches for lost hunters, hikers, or Alzheimer's patients, sources of emergency locator transmitter signals, and missing aircraft. The center frequently dispatches rescue assets to provide aid and transportation to people needing medical attention in remote or isolated areas, for emergency organ or blood transportation, or for medical evacuations, when civilian resources are not available.

The United States Coast Guard is responsible for Search and Rescue missions over water and operates similar Rescue Coordination Centers in each of its districts.

== History ==
Prior to 1974, the Air Force divided the continental United States into three regions, each with a separate rescue center. In May of that year, the Air Force consolidated the three centers into one facility at Scott Air Force Base, Illinois. This provided better coordination of activities, improved communications and economy of operations, and standardized procedures. The newly formed center permitted operations with fewer people, while creating a more experienced staff. In 1993, the AFRCC relocated to Langley Air Force Base, Virginia, when Air Combat Command assumed responsibility for Air Force peacetime and combat SAR. In October 2003, the AFRCC was realigned under the Air Force Special Operations Command. Then in April 2006, the AFRCC was realigned back to Air Combat Command. On 1 March 2007 the AFRCC was moved from Langley to Tyndall Air Force Base under 1st Air Force (AFNORTH) commander. Since the center opened in May 1974, missions have resulted in more than 20,000 lives saved.

== Patch history ==
AFRCC Emblem/Patch

The emblem of the AFRCC was developed in late 1992 by its members at Scott AFB, Illinois shortly after word was received that Air Rescue Service (ARS) was to be stood down. The newly formed Air Combat Command (ACC) assumed responsibility for United States Air Force Rescue assets in 1993 as a result of a service-wide reorganization and the AFRCC moved to Langley AFB, Virginia. In 2003 under another Air Force wide reorganization the AFRCC was realigned under the Director of Operations, HQ Air Force Special Operations Command while its location remained at Langley AFB. In April 2006 the AFRCC was re-aligned under 1 AF and subsequently re-located to Tyndall AFB March 2007.

The emblem depicts the broad mission of search and rescue in the United States. The green and blue represent the Inland Region, both land and air with the resources used the most often for search and rescue. Fixed and rotary wing aircraft and the Search and Rescue Satellite-Aided Tracking System are highlighted with red lightning bolts representing a rapid response. The yellow and black represent peacetime and combat SAR and the eagle is the AFRCC, continuously fostering a cooperative search and rescue network.

== See also ==
- National Search and Rescue Plan
- Joint Rescue Coordination Centre Trenton - located north of USAFRCC and operated by Canadian Coast Guard and Royal Canadian Air Force
- Civil Air Patrol - U.S. Air Force Auxiliary
