= International Aeronautical and Maritime Search and Rescue Manual =

Handbook for maritime search and rescue

The International Aeronautical and Maritime Search and Rescue (IAMSAR) Manual is a manual for organization and operation of maritime and aviation search and rescue.

The IAMSAR Handbook is jointly published by two UN agencies:

- International Civil Aviation Organization (ICAO)
- International Maritime Organization (IMO)

It contains guidelines for Search and Rescue in terms of shipping and aviation. The purpose of a common manual is to ensure that cooperation between the two areas of operation is effective and that operational cooperation can be carried out in actual rescue operations between different organizational and rescue units. It is important to ensure smooth cooperation between the two areas because many ship and aircraft accidents involve both ships and aircraft in the search and rescue operations.

The IAMSAR Manual consists of three volumes, which are published as a loose-leaf collection.

- Volume I. Organization and Management
- Volume II. Mission Co-ordination
- Volume III. Mobile Facilities

Volume I, "Organization and Management", deals with the meaning of international, regional and national Search and Rescue activities and intergovernmental cooperation to achieve well-functioning and cost-effective SAR work. This volume is aimed primarily at the relevant government agencies.

Volume II, "Mission Co-ordination", provides guidelines for the planning and implementation of rescue operations and exercises. Volume II is to be carried on board rescue units and all other aircraft and ships that have the capacity, and in some cases, an obligation, to participate in Search and Rescue work. The target groups are rescue organizations and the national rescue centers (JRCC, MRCC, and ARCC).

Volume III, "Mobile Facilities", must be carried on board by all vehicles that can undertake search or rescue tasks. This includes all merchant ships, as in an emergency they must be able to perform SAR operations and coordinate as on-scene commander. Volume III describes in detail communication, organization and search methodology on site. It also contains guidelines for SAR aspects regarding the evacuation of your craft in an emergency.

Future additions being considered include enhanced man overboard (MOB) technologies, including SAR operation software for ECDIS and SAR drones.

== Adoption ==
The United States' National Search and Rescue Supplement was written as a supplement to the IAMSAR, and together they constitute the U.S.'s National Search and Rescue Plan. The United States Coast Guard also publishes an addendum to the supplement which is referenced several times in the USCG's Radiotelephone Handbook.

== Usage during major SAR operations ==
The Malaysian Airlines’ MH370 disappearance led ICAO to propose changes to how SAR air operations are conducted and prepared for, including the mandatory carriage of automatically deployable flight recorders. The possible changes are being considered for the 2019 edition.

According to at least one source,

In fact, for decades ICAO has observed that "in many areas of the world, the fastest, most effective and practical way to achieve a global SAR service is to develop regional systems" (from its International Aeronautical and Maritime SAR (IAMSAR) manual). Sovereign states have verbally supported the concept, but concerns over sovereignty, nationalism and politics have stood in the way.

== Sources ==
- International Civil Aviation Organization and International Maritime Organization: IAMSAR MANUAL, Volume I: ORGANIZATION AND MANAGEMENT, 2025 Edition
- International Civil Aviation Organization and International Maritime Organization: IAMSAR MANUAL, Volume II: MISSION CO-ORDINATION, 2022 Edition
- International Civil Aviation Organization and International Maritime Organization: IAMSAR MANUAL, Volume III: MOBILE FACILITIES, 2022 Edition
