= National Search and Rescue Plan =

The National Search and Rescue Plan or National SAR Plan is a policy document of the US government that establishes the responsibilities for search and rescue in the domestic United States, as well as areas where the US has international commitments.

The Plan makes the US Coast Guard responsible for maritime search and rescue, while inland SAR is the responsibility of the Air Force. Both have Rescue Coordination Centers to coordinate this effort, and also cooperatively operate Joint Rescue Coordination Centers where appropriate. These centers receive Cospas-Sarsat distress alerts sent by the United States Mission Control Center in Suitland, Maryland and are responsible for coordinating the rescue response to the distress. Each service takes a slightly different approach to search and rescue operations.

== Inland SAR ==
The Air Force Rescue Coordination Center at Tyndall Air Force Base, Florida, coordinates all inland search and rescue activities in the continental U.S., but does not directly prosecute SAR cases. In most situations, the actual operation is carried out by the Civil Air Patrol, state police or local rescue services.

== Maritime SAR ==
The US Coast Guard coordinates and conducts maritime SAR missions. The Coast Guard uses the Search and Rescue Optimal Planning System to most accurately model leeway divergence for many search and rescue objects as well as optimize planned search areas.

Coast Guard RCCs are set up to cover specific geographic areas and react to command and coordination centers. The geographic areas of responsibility are divided among nine Coast Guard District commands and two Rescue Sub-Centers (RSC).

USCG RCCs

- District 1 - Boston, Massachusetts
- Atlantic Area/District 5 - Portsmouth, Virginia (RCC Norfolk)
- District 7 - Miami, Florida
- District 8 - New Orleans, Louisiana
- District 2 - Cleveland, Ohio
- Pacific Area/District 11- Alameda, California
- District 13- Seattle, Washington
- District 14- Honolulu, Hawaii
- District 17- Juneau, Alaska
- Puerto Rico RSC - San Juan, Puerto Rico
- Marianas RSC - Guam

== Other ==
The U.S. Department of Defense Southern Command Search and Rescue Center in Key West, Florida helps to coordinate Cospas-Sarsat activity in Central and South America.
