= E.M.I.L.Y. =

Robotic rescue device

E.M.I.L.Y.

E.M.I.L.Y. demonstration video

E.M.I.L.Y. (sometimes, EMILY or Emily; acronym for Emergency Integrated Lifesaving Lanyard) is a robotic device used by lifeguards for rescuing swimmers. Created by Hydronalix, a maritime robotic company, and funded by the United States Navy, EMILY operates on battery power and is operated by remote control after being dropped into the water from shore, a boat, pier, or helicopter. Using an impeller motor to travel through water, it is able to reach victims much faster than a human lifeguard can by swimming, and it is more compact and less expensive to maintain than crewed watercraft. It can also operate in weather and surf conditions that make other rescue attempts impractical. Once it reaches the victims its foam core allows it to function as a flotation device for four to six people holding onto side ropes or handles.

== History ==
EMILY was created in 2001 by inventor and Hydronalix CEO Anthony Mulligan and Robert Lautrup, and named after Marie Mulligan's friend, who died in a car accident. It was initially designed to be a drone for whale monitoring. It was first tested in Zuma Beach near Malibu, California, and at Depoe Bay, Oregon and Westerly, Rhode Island beginning early 2010. In July 2012, lifeguards there made one of the first rescues using EMILY, pulling a father and son to shore after they had been caught in a rip current.

In 2012, a multi-day duration gasoline powered variant of EMILY for ocean-based storm tracking and weather data collection was developed and funded by NOAA.

EMILY has been used by navies, coast guards, and search-and-rescue units in countries around the world including South Korea, Indonesia, Japan, the United Kingdom, France, Mongolia, Brazil, Mexico, and Greece.

== Features ==
EMILY is a small unmanned surface vessel (USV). It can travel up to 22 mph and weighs 25 pounds. The robot is remote-controlled and can be deployed from land, off a bridge, a boat or aircraft. Features include:

- a two-way radio
- a live-streaming video camera
- lights for night rescues

== Rescues ==
In January 2016, EMILY joined a Roboticists Without Borders team from Texas A&M University Center for Robotic Assisted Search and Rescue on a successful mission to Lesvos Island, Greece to assist in ocean rescues of Syrian refugees crossing the Aegean Sea from Turkey to Greece. In the first few days of embedded missions with the Hellenic Red Cross, EMILY assisted the Red Cross and other lifeguard organizations to help more than 250 refugees safely come ashore on Lesvos.

The EMILY has had successes, and assists the Red Cross with JASPERRO, a less intelligent AI machine. There are currently systems with the Hellenic Red Cross, the Hellenic Coast Guard, and in Turkey.

== See also ==
- Search and rescue
