= Air Force Fire Protection Badge =

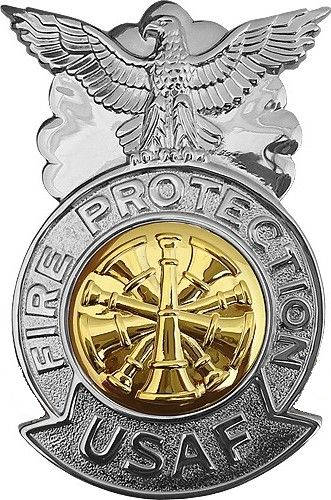
United States Air Force Fire Chief/Marshal Badge

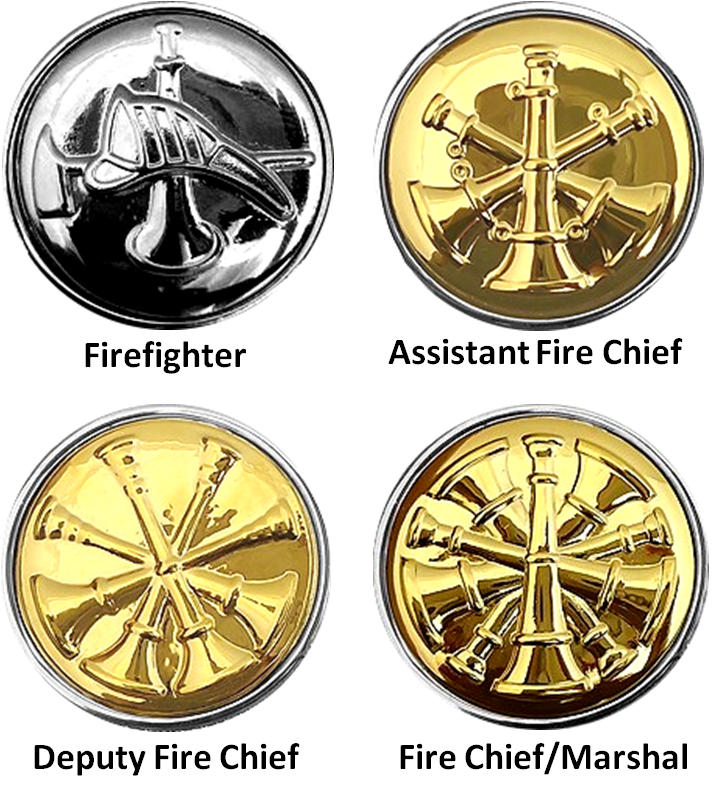
Air Force Fire Protection Badge scrambles

The Air Force Fire Protection Badge is a military badge of the United States Air Force that is issued to those service members who have been trained in safety and fire prevention, have qualified as military firefighters, and have been assigned to an Air Force fire department.

The Air Force Fire Protection Badge is considered an identification emblem rather than a personal decoration and is only worn when serving in the capacity as an Air Force firefighter; the Air Force Fire Protection Badge must be surrendered upon termination of duty as a firefighter and is not considered a permanent decoration.

The Air Force Fire Protection Badge is worn on the lower left breast pocket of a military uniform. The badge is similar in appearance to the Air Force Security Police Badge. The Fire Protection career field falls under Civil Engineering. All Air Force Fire Protection Specialists are also awarded the Civil Engineer Occupational Badge, which stays with the Airman throughout his or her career. Other branches of the U.S. military have not authorized a specific firefighter badge for wear of military uniforms. Only Air Force personnel are authorized to wear a firefighter badge on Air Force uniforms (highly polished metal for dress uniforms, subdued green for BDU, subdued tan for DCU).

The center shield, or "scramble," of the firefighter's badge is replaced with different bugles to denote different fire officers. One silver bugle with a crossed fire ax and helmet is worn by firefighters, three gold bugles is worn by Assistant Fire Chiefs, four gold bugles for Deputy Fire Chiefs, and five gold bugles for Fire Chiefs and Base Fire Marshals.

== History of Air Force Fire Protection Badge ==
Consideration of a distinctive emblem for USAF Fire Protection Personnel began in the fall of 1964. The present device was approved in early spring 1965. Military and civilian fire protection personnel were authorized in July 1965 to wear a standard organizational emblem identifying them as being assigned to fire protection activities.

Initial stocks of 43,000 of the blue, red, gold, and white embroidered emblems had been ordered by Headquarters USAF. They were distributed through major air commands on the basis of three per individual connected with fire protection.

The new patch will be worn according to AFM 35-10; this means over the left breast pocket. The emblem can be worn on regular utility and special purpose clothing, but not on military service, dress, and improved fatigue uniforms.

The patch is a circular device topped by a golden eagle against a white cloud. A fireman's helmet, trumpet, and axe are depicted in red on a white circular background in the center. "USAF" In blue on a gold background and "Fire Protection" in white on a blue background are lettered around the white center.

== See also ==
- Badges of the United States Air Force
- Air Force Security Police Badge
- U.S. Defense Department firefighters
