= R&R (military) =

Military abbreviation for "rest and recuperation"

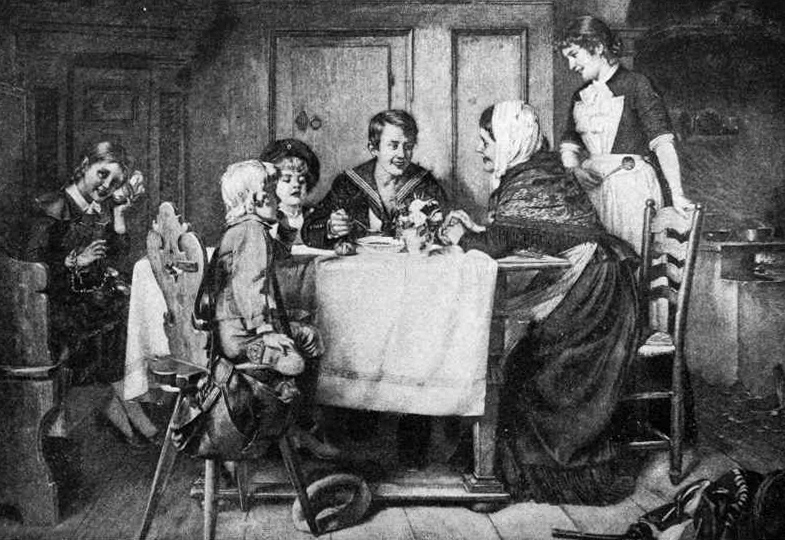
A young sailor returns home to his mother and siblings in this 1904 illustration.

R&R, military slang for rest and recuperation (also rest and rehabilitation, rest and relaxation, or rest and recreation), is an abbreviation used for the free time of a soldier or international UN staff serving in unaccompanied (no family) duty stations. The term is used by a number of militaries such as the United States Armed Forces and British Armed Forces. In the UK, the term applies to a type of leave granted to personnel during an overseas deployment which allows them to return home to the UK to visit their family.

== R&R in the U.S. armed forces ==
The US Morale, Welfare and Recreation network provides leisure services for US military personnel. Service members and US Defense Department civilians on 12-month tours in Iraq and Jordan supporting Operation Iraqi Freedom and Afghanistan supporting Operation Enduring Freedom have a rest and recuperation leave program that allows them to take up to 15 days, excluding travel time, to visit family or friends in the United States or Europe.

All US military personnel serving in Vietnam during the Vietnam War were eligible for one R&R during their tour of duty (13 months for marines, 12 months for soldiers, sailors, airmen). The duration of R&R was five days leave to R&R destinations, Bangkok, Hong Kong, Kuala Lumpur, Penang, Manila, Seoul, Singapore, Taipei and Tokyo (as well as in-country at China Beach). Due to their greater distance, seven days leave was permitted for R&R destinations Hawaii and Sydney. Bangkok was reportedly most popular with single GIs, Hawaii most popular with married GIs planning to holiday with spouses.

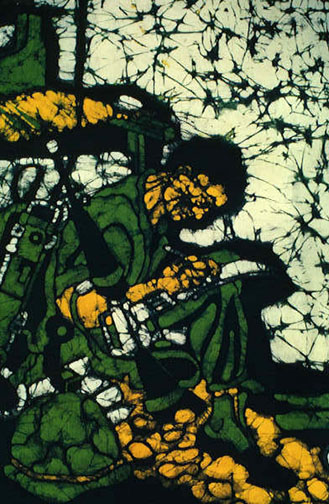
Letter To Home by Stephen H. Randall, U.S. Army Vietnam Combat Artists, 1968

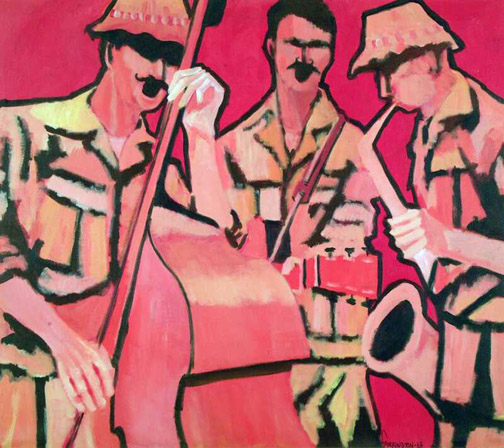
Time Out by David N. Fairrington, U.S. Army Vietnam Combat Artists (1968) (soldiers relaxing in Vietnam)

=== Prostitution ===
Prostitution has long been part of soldiers' R&R activity. It has been condoned by civilian populations in peacetime and wartime since early history, although some see it as a problem due to human trafficking concerns.

Japan after the unconditional surrender to the United States at the end of the Second World War in 1945 and South Korea during the 1950s saw the effective institution of "camp towns" around the US bases, where brothels were allowed to operate unfettered.

In the Vietnam War, the official policy of the United States Department of Defense was to suppress prostitution. Prostitution however, was relied upon by the US military to combat the battlefield trauma many faced. Women worked in bars, nightclubs, massage parlors and bathhouses across various R&R spots in Asia for the appeasement of the American military servicemen. The popularity of bar girls was high because upon "rental", the GI would receive a legally enforceable contract. When a GI decided which girl he wanted, the girls would serve as a companion and guide.

Pattaya Beach in Thailand was a fishing village until the 1960s when thousands of U.S. troops from Vietnam showed up for R&R, leading to the creation of one of the largest red light districts in the world. The heart of its economy remains sex tourism. Soldiers sometimes called the breaks "I&I" for "intoxication and intercourse". The 1973 novel Saint Jack and its 1979 film adaptation revolve around the American GIs who came to Singapore during the Vietnam War on R&R for the prostitution that was prevalent in the city-state at the time.

In 2006, the Department of Defense made it a crime for a service member to hire a prostitute anywhere in the world; the penalties can include up to a year in prison, forfeiture of pay, and a dishonorable discharge. This change was criticized by some in Europe, where prostitution is legal and regulated in some countries.

== See also ==
- Amerasian
- Shore leave
- United States military and prostitution in South Korea
