= United States Air Force Pararescue Indoctrination Course =

Mandatory selection course

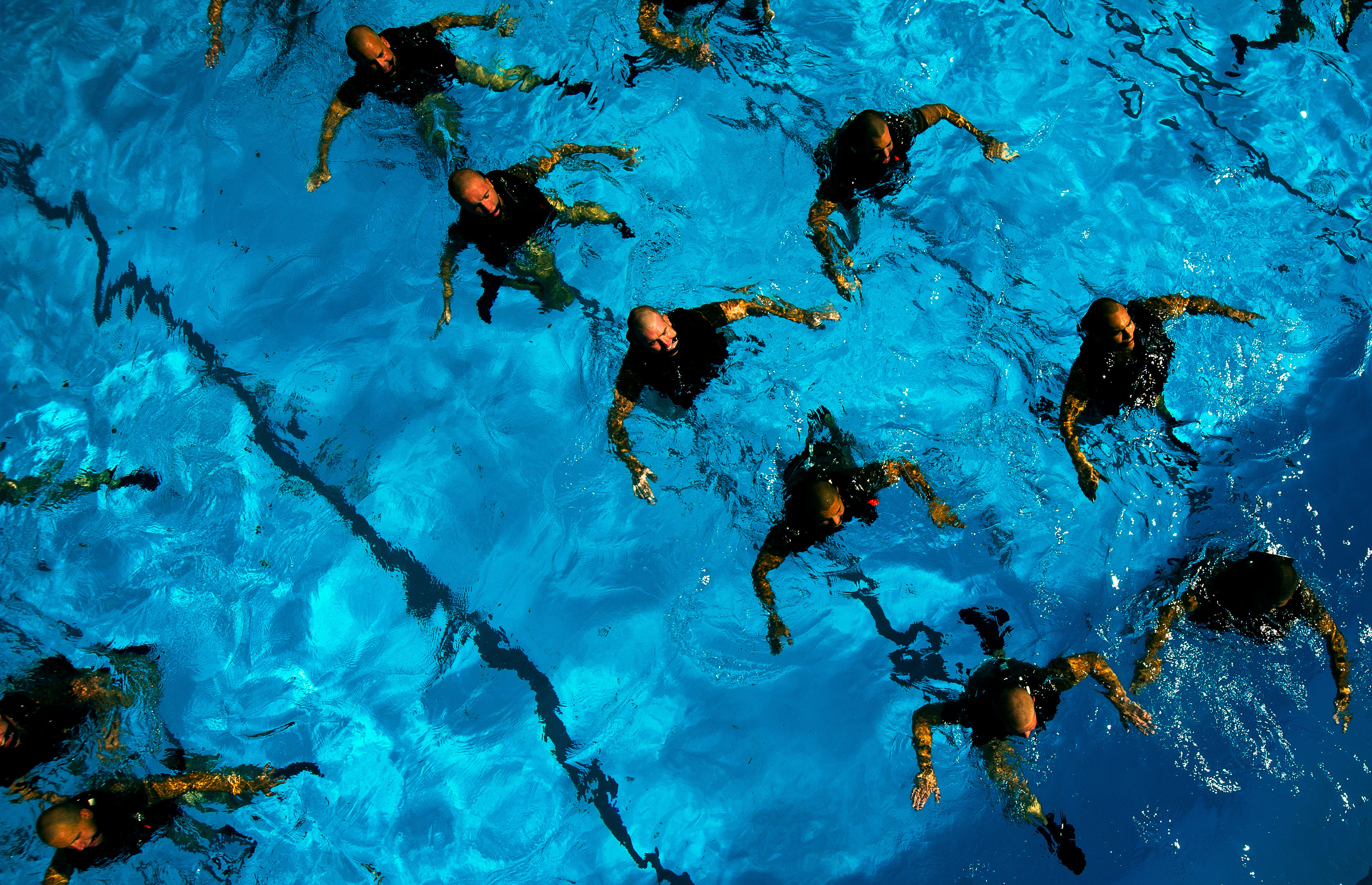
United States Air Force Pararescue trainees treading water during a pool session in an Indoctrination course

The United States Air Force Pararescue Indoctrination Course was a 9 week long mandatory selection course that United States Air Force airmen must pass in order to attend the USAF Pararescue training course. This course has since been phased out with PJ hopefuls attending the AFSPECWAR Assessment & Selection Course at Chapman Annex, Joint Base San Antonio Lackland.

== Description ==
The Indoctrination Course consists of two distinct sections. The first section is a selection phase, in which students are put through rigorous physical, mental, and emotional stressors, during which they either decide to continue training, or drop out from the course. In the second portion of the course, students are no longer actively selected, but are instead trained up to graduation standards.

During the nine–week selection period, USAF airmen perform a number of running, calisthenics, swimming, and underwater exercises. This is done with the intention of fulfilling three goals for the candidates: acclimate them to the rigors of working and living as a Pararescueman, instill in them teamwork and other Pararescue values, and prepare them for eventual success in the training and operational duties of Pararescue.

== Phases ==
The first phase is the selection period, during which candidates are put through a series of rigorous exercises including calisthenics, swimming, running, and underwater exercises. With attrition rates averaging from 70 to 100%, many candidates self eliminate during this portion. When a candidate self eliminates, he will not continue with indoctrination course, and will therefore not go on to train as a Pararescueman. The selection period culminates in extended training day, an extra long day of physical training meant to simulate a real life mission. After extended training day, candidates are awarded a blue ascot.

The second phase is the training phase, in which students are physically trained up to graduation standards. Students must perform to standards and progress to the graduation standards by the end of the course. In a select few cases, students that fail predetermined evaluation checks are allowed to "wash back". A washback is permitted to drop from the current indoctrination course, and re-attempt the course at a later date.

== Graduation ==
The pass rate for the indoctrination course maintains a high attrition rate. On average, the attrition rate is over 80%. Classes in the past have graduated as few as one or zero members. Upon graduation, students obtain approval to complete the two year Pararescue training course, called "The Pipeline". This training consists of a series of courses such as parachutist training, combat dive training, and an EMT-Paramedic course, among others.

== Preparatory resources ==
There are many resources to aid candidates in preparing to pass the indoctrination course. One such source is prior service Pararescueman Mike Maroney, known by People Magazine for his search to find a girl he rescued during the 2005 Hurricane Katrina. Maroney runs a YouTube account where he posts instructional videos focused on preparing candidates for Pararescue. Additionally, training programs exist in order to help physically prepare for indoctrination. Online forums provide educational spaces for future trainees to connect.
