= Rufus Hessberg =

American physician (1921–1995)

Dr. Rufus Rosendale Hessberg (March 29, 1921 – July 27, 1995) was an American physicist who served as a US Army Medical Corps doctor during World War II and later was a pioneer aeromedical scientist. He served as an early instructor at the Air Rescue Specialists Course at Gunter AFB, Alabama in 1949, teaching some of the Air Force's first Pararescuemen. He went on to head the animal research group for Project Mercury. He served for several years as an Executive Vice President of the Aerospace Medical Association before retiring in 1991.

Hessberg was born in Albany, New York, on March 29, 1921. He died in Alexandria, Virginia, on July 27, 1995, at the age of 74.
