= Richard T. Kight =

United States Air Force general

- Born: October 18, 1913
- Died: June 17, 2001 (aged 87)
- Allegiance: United States
- Branch: United States Air Force
- Rank: Brigadier General
- Commands: U.S. Air Rescue Service (1946–1952)
- Known for: Author of the Code of an Air Rescueman
- Awards: Kight Award (named in his honor)

Brigadier General Richard T. Kight (October 18, 1913 – June 17, 2001) was commander of the U.S. Air Rescue Service from 1946 to 1952, and penned the Code of an Air Rescueman: It is my duty as a Air Rescueman to save life and to aid the injured. I will be prepared at all times to perform my assigned duties quickly and efficiently, placing these duties before personal desires and comforts. These things I do, "That Others May Live.". It is still used by the Air Force Rescue Coordination Center (AFRCC) and all other USAF air rescue squadrons. The Pararescueman's creed is essentially these same words although the original code applied to all crewmen of the Air Rescue Service. The Kight Award is named after him and is presented annually to recognize an active duty or reserve component member who has contributed to the overall effectiveness of the rescue mission area through management, innovation or other outstanding achievement.
