= United States Air Force Pararescue =

US Air Force personnel specializing in combat search and rescue

USAF Pararescue
- U.S. Air Force Pararescue Beret Crest (colorized)
- Founded: May 1946 – active
- Country: United States
- Branch: United States Air Force
- Type: Special operations force
- Role: Combat search and rescue Direct action Raiding; Hostage rescue Close-quarters combat Tactical emergency medical services Medical evacuation
- Part of: Air Combat Command (as Guardian Angel Weapon System); Air Force Special Operations Command; U.S. Special Operations Command; Air Force Reserve Command; Air National Guard (operationally gained by a MAJCOM when federalized)
- Nicknames: "PJs", "Maroon Berets", "Rescue Rangers", "Air Commandos"
- Mottos: "These Things We Do, That Others May Live"
- Color of Beret: Maroon

Insignia
- Maroon beret with Pararescueman Crest

Pararescuemen (also known as Pararescue Jumpers or PJs) are United States Air Force special operators who conduct personnel recovery and combat search and rescue operations as well as other missions for the U.S. military and its allies. PJs are generally assigned to Air Force Special Operations Command (AFSOC) and Air Combat Command (ACC).

Personnel recovery includes rescuing and providing medical treatment to injured or stranded personnel in hostile or remote environments, such as behind enemy lines or in the wilderness. Combat search and rescue operations recover personnel from enemy-controlled territory.

They are attached to other special operations units from all branches to conduct other operations as appropriate. PJs have also supported NASA missions, and have recovered astronauts after water landings.

Long an enlisted preserve, the Pararescue service expanded to include Combat Rescue Officers early in the 21st century. Of the roughly 200 Air Force Cross recipients, 12 are Pararescuemen.

== History ==
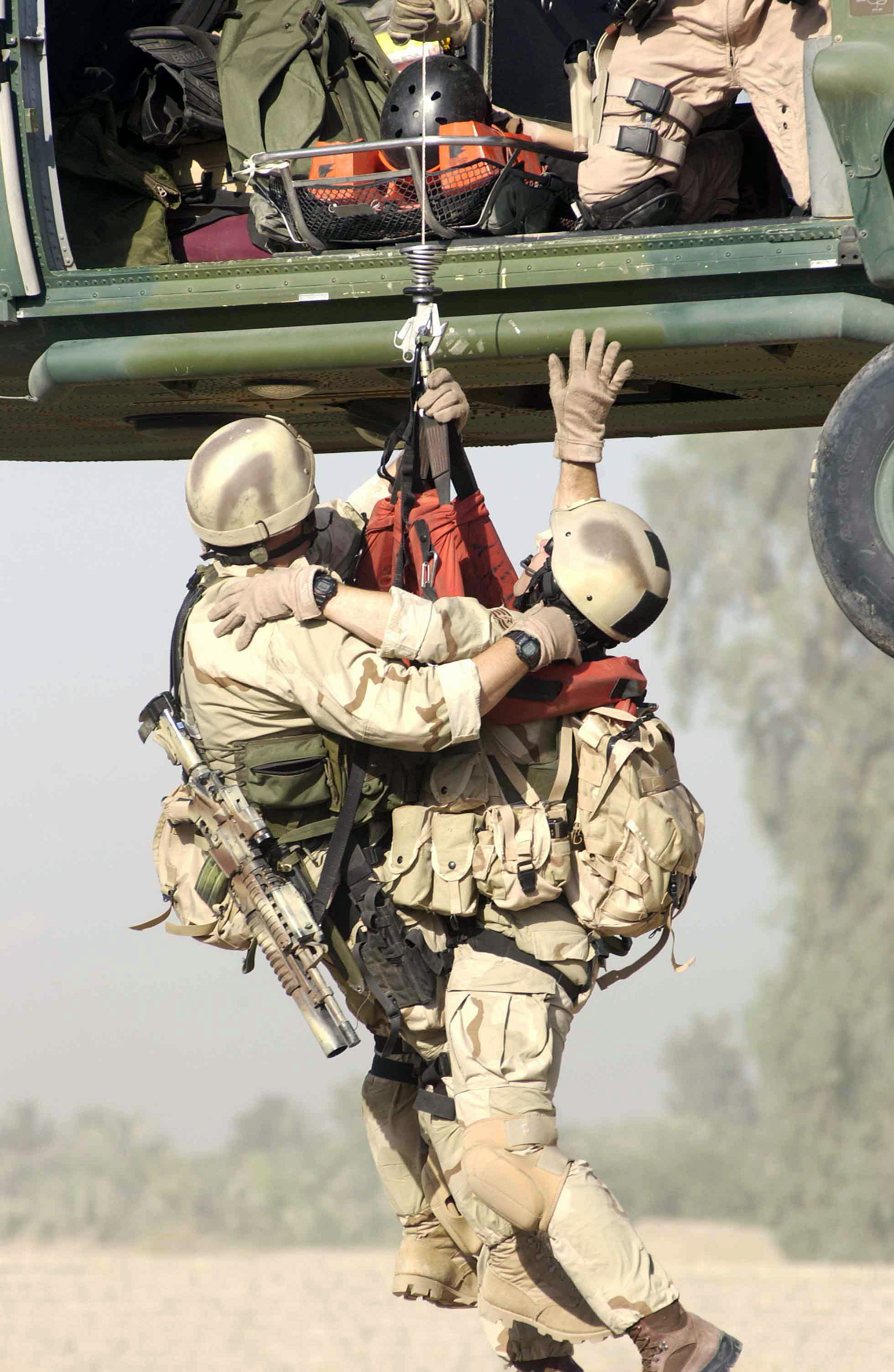
U.S. Air Force Pararescue personnel assigned to Baghdad International Airport (BIAP), perform a hoist extraction of a survivor during an Urban Operations Training Exercise (UOTE) at the Maltz training site, in support of Operation Iraqi Freedom, 2003.

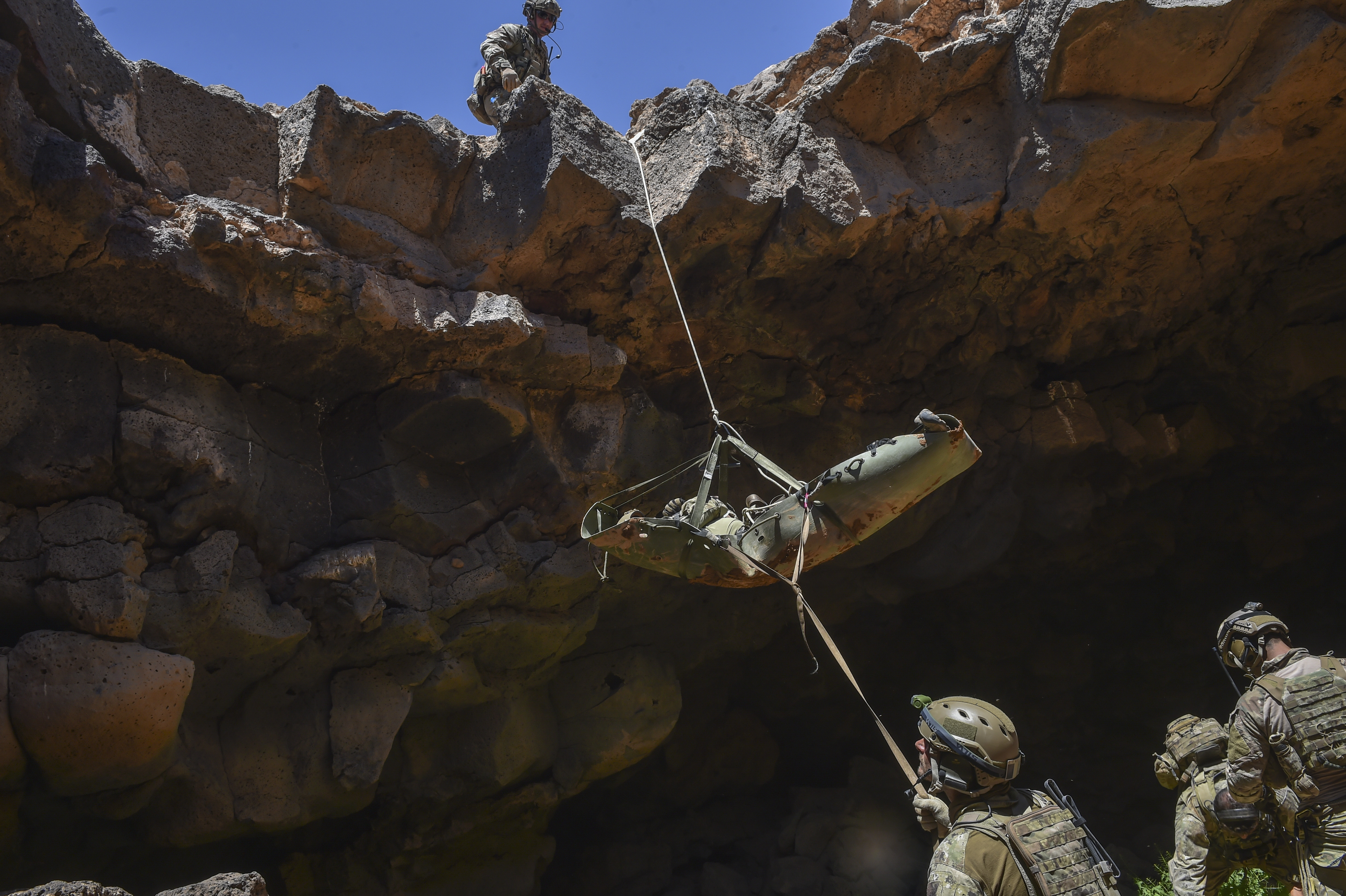
Special Tactics Pararescue Aircrew, Jordanian Armed Force Special Task Force, and Italian special operations forces pull a simulated casualty out of the Al Biadia Cave Complex during a personnel rescue mission for Eager Lion in Mafraq Province, Jordan.

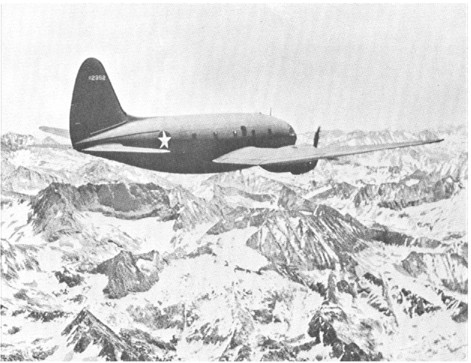
Curtiss C-46 'Commando' over the Himalayas

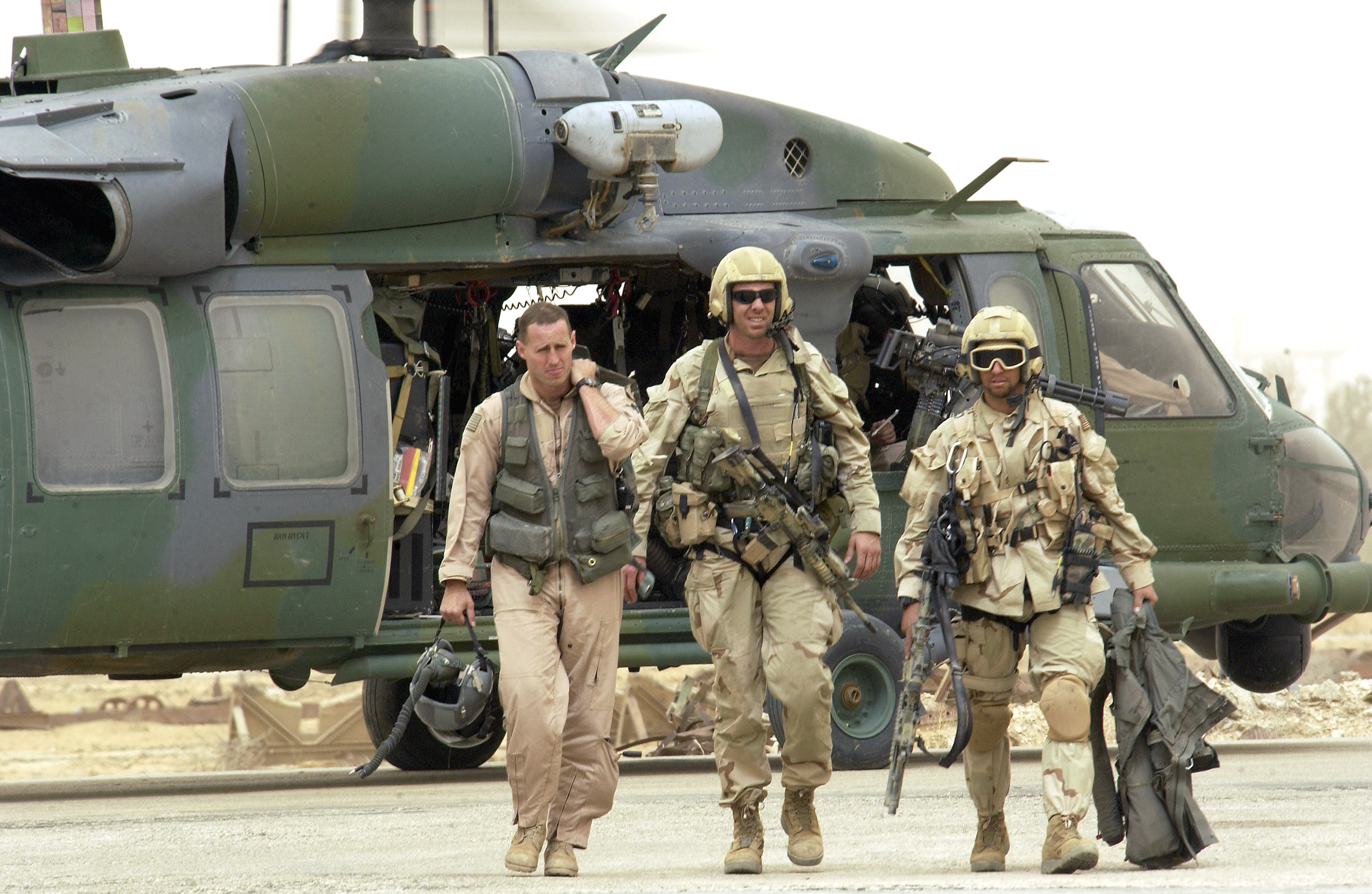
Pararescuemen with the 301st Rescue Squadron return with a downed pilot from a successful rescue mission 8 April 2003 at a forward deployed location in southern Iraq during Operation Iraqi Freedom.

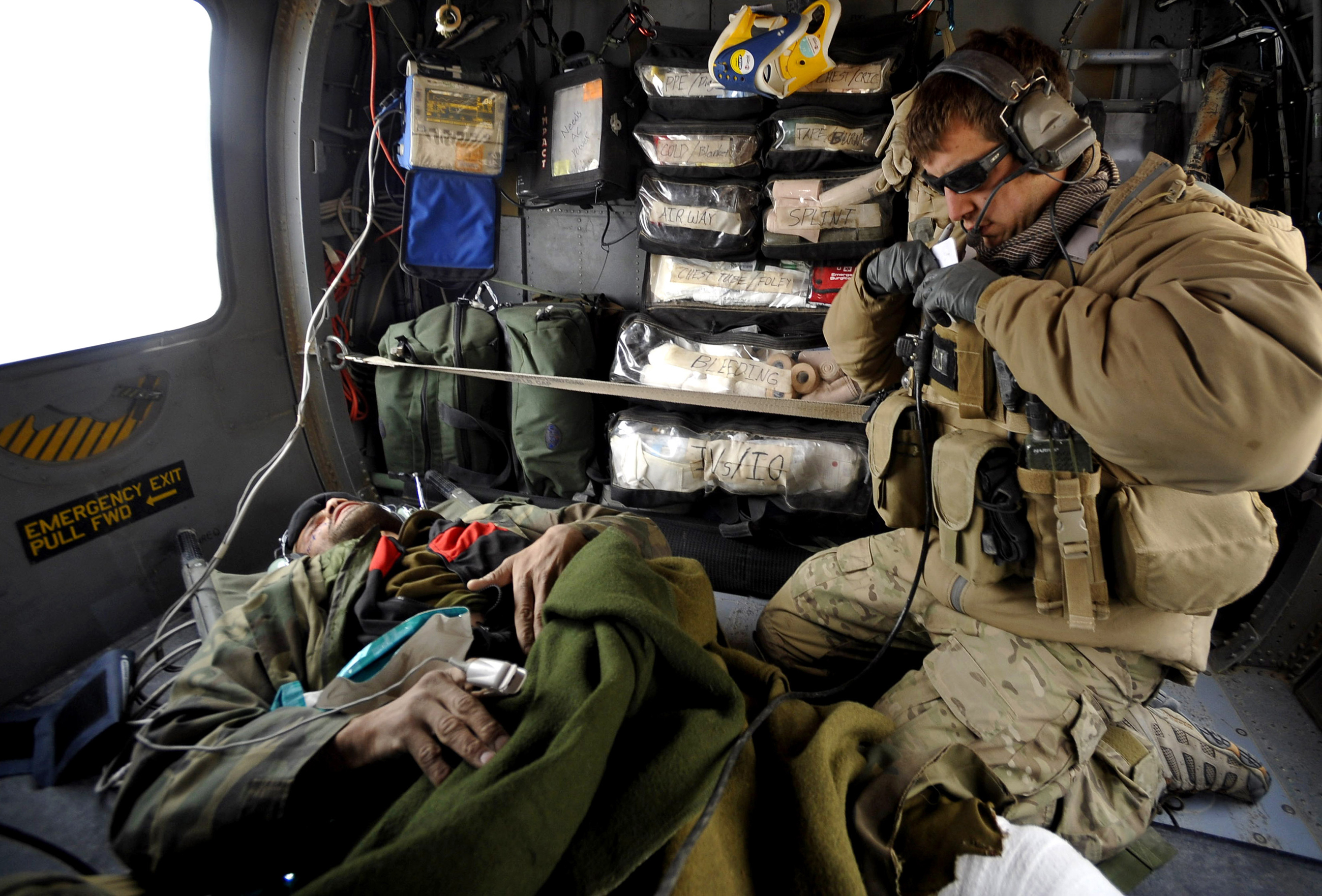
A pararescueman from the 66th Expeditionary Rescue Squadron provides medical attention to a wounded Afghan.

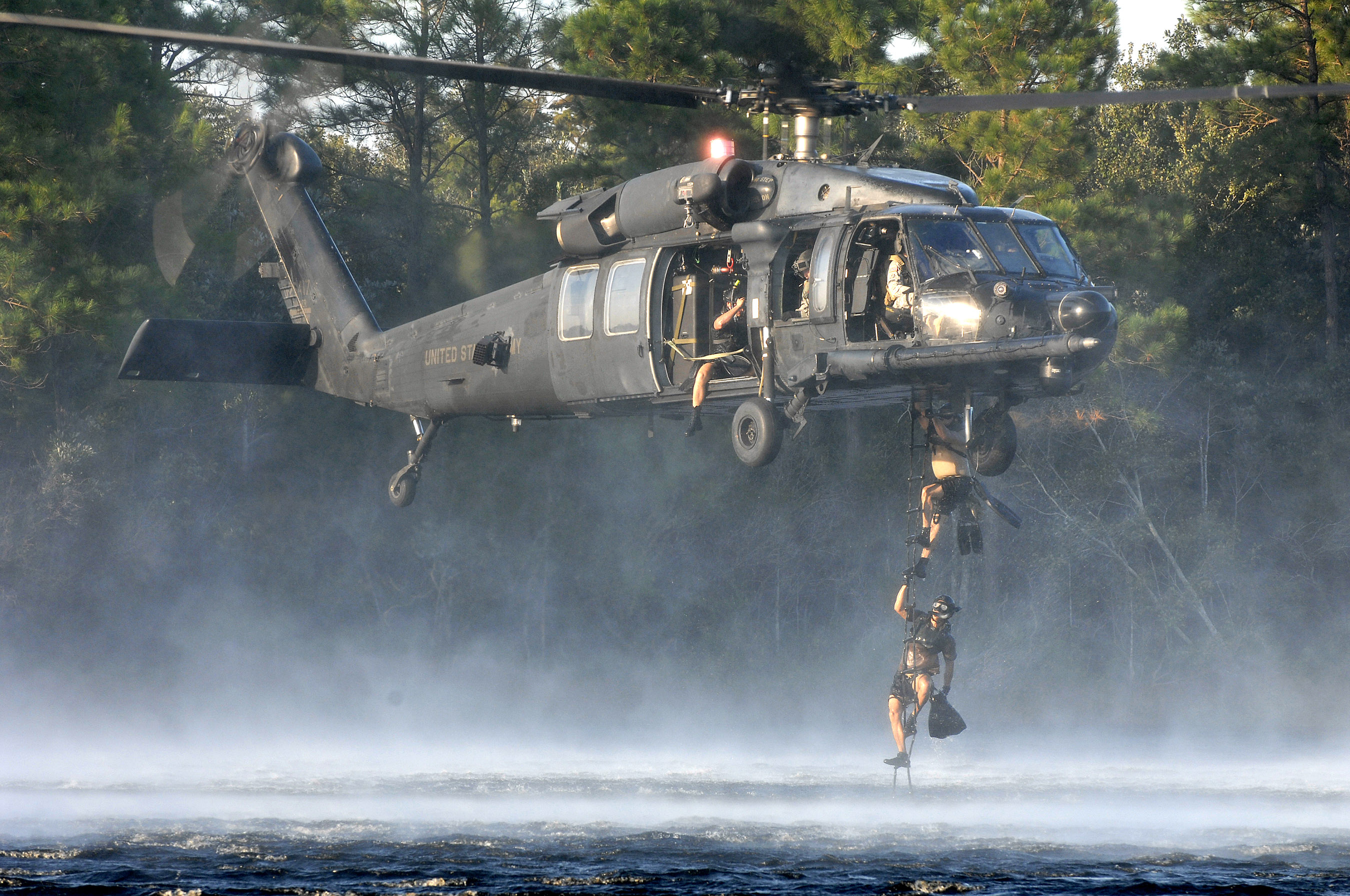
Pararescuemen from the 23rd Special Tactics Squadron climb a ladder into a U.S. Army MH-60 Blackhawk

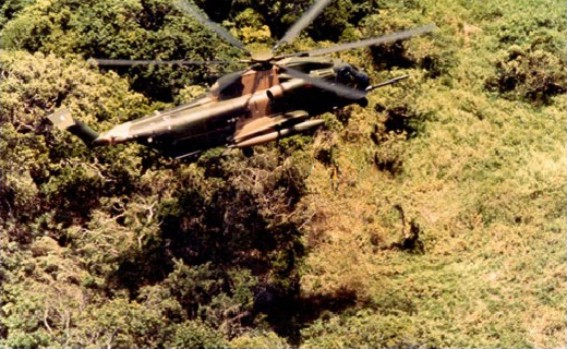
An HH-53C lowering a PJ during a rescue mission, June 1970.

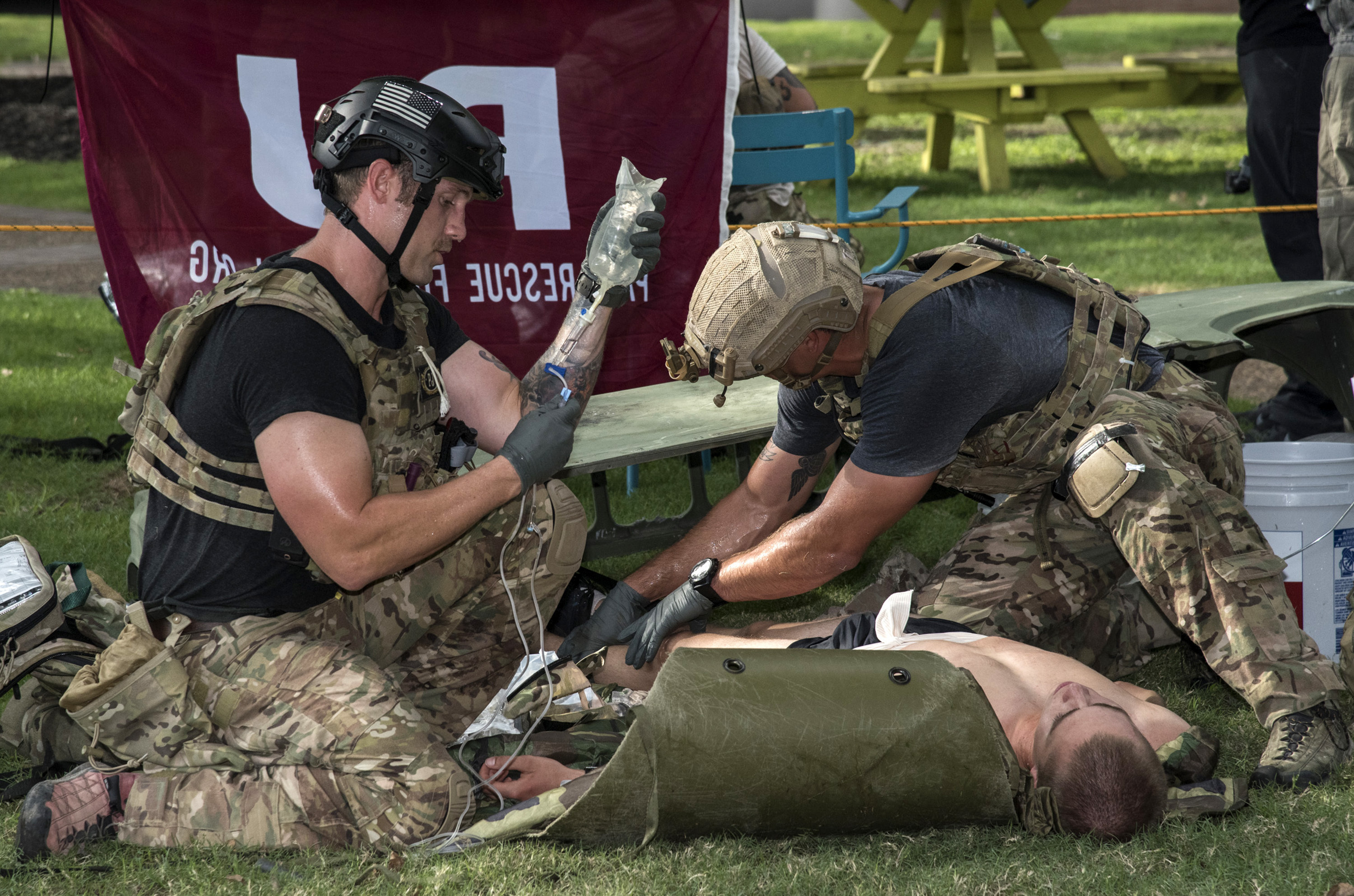
Pararescuemen perform tactical combat casualty care during the 2018 PJ Rodeo at Travis Park in San Antonio, Texas

=== Pre-World War II ===
As early as 1922, there was a recognized need for trained personnel to go to remote sites to rescue aircrew. In that year, Army Medical Corps doctor Colonel Albert E. Truby predicted that "airplane ambulances" would be used to take medical personnel to crashes and to return victims to medical facilities for treatment. However, it was another two decades before technology and necessity helped to create what would eventually become Air Force Pararescue.

Even so, there were developments in critical technologies. In 1940, two United States Forest Service Smokejumpers, Earl Cooley and Rufus Robinson, showed that parachutists could be placed very accurately onto the ground using the newly invented 'steerable parachute'. These parachutes, and the techniques smokejumpers used with them, were completely different from those used by Army airborne units. It was in that year that Dr. (Captain) Leo P. Martin was trained by the U.S. Forest Service Smokejumper Parachute Training Center in Seeley Lake, Montana as the first 'para-doctor'.

=== World War II ===
During the first months after America's entry into the war, there was very little need for air rescue. As the war progressed, a U.S. strategic bombing campaign was launched, and air rescue began to play a key role.

Rescue units were formed around the globe under the operational control of local commanders. While training, techniques and equipment varied, one rule was constant: "Rescue forces must presume survivors in each crash until proved otherwise."

Search and rescue of downed aviators in the continental United States fell primarily to the Civil Air Patrol, a civilian aviation group under the command of the Army Air Corps. The CAP would usually send in ground crews after locating a crash site; however, they would sometimes land small aircraft and they did experiment with parachute rescue teams.

With Canada's entry into WWII in 1939, former Canadian fighter ace Wop May was put in charge of training operations and took over command at the No 2 Air Observer School in Edmonton, Alberta. Edmonton was one of the common stops for Douglas A-20 Boston, Martin B-26 Marauder and especially North American B-25 Mitchell bombers being flown to the Soviet Union as part of the lend-lease program. When these aircraft went down, likely due to mechanical or navigational problems, the crew often survived only to die attempting to make it out of the bush. May's school was often asked to supply aircraft to search for downed planes, but even when one was spotted there was often little they could do to help. May decided to address this problem.

In early 1942, May asked for volunteers from his civilian servicing crew, and about a dozen agreed to join. With basically no equipment, the instruction consisted of "jump and pull" and windage was calculated by throwing an Eaton's catalogue out the door. Early operations were comical, but in early 1943, May sent two volunteers, Owen Hargreaves and Scotty Thompson to the smoke jumpers school in Missoula, Montana to be trained by the U.S. Forest Service. After six weeks they returned home with borrowed steerable equipment to train two other volunteers, Wilfred Rivet and Laurie Poulsom. Soon the unit was conducting operational jumps, and by 1944 May's persistence had paid off and an official para-rescue training program started. For his work, May was awarded a Medal of Freedom with Bronze Palm in 1947 by the USAAF.

In the European Theater, there was very little opportunity for ground rescue. Most flights were over enemy-occupied territory, where a landing meant immediate capture. In the UK area of the European Theatre, the British military was at the time creating its own Royal Air Force Mountain Rescue Service which would be based largely on civilian mountain rescue doctrine. The RAFMRS rescued many American aircrew, or recovered remains, from USAAF crashes over its UK territory. As crashes during over-water flights created a great many casualties, the Eighth Air Force initiated a 'sea rescue' group. From its creation in 1943 until the end of the war, the recovery rate of aircrews downed at sea rose from less than five percent to over forty percent.

In the vast reaches of the Pacific Theater, a plane crash meant almost certain death from exposure to the elements. The Army formed several squadrons in theater specifically to aid and rescue downed flyers—both at sea and on islands—with great success.

The China Burma India Theater (CBI) during World War II became the birthplace of what later evolved into pararescue. Unlike other theaters, the CBI presented a combination of long overland transport flights over terrain that was only loosely held by Japanese forces, meaning downed crews frequently survived crashes rather than facing immediate capture or drowning. Central to operations was "The Hump"—the airlift route crossing the Himalayas from India to supply forces in China using C-46 and C-47 transports. Severe weather, high altitudes, and mechanical failures caused frequent crashes in remote mountains and jungle, leaving injured aircrews stranded for weeks and creating the demand for dedicated aerial search and medical rescue teams.

Capt. John L. "Blackie" Porter—a former stunt pilot—is credited with commanding the first organized air rescue unit in the theater. Known as "Blackie's Gang" and flying out of Chabua, India, they were equipped with two C-47 aircraft. One of their first rescue missions was the recovery of twenty people who had bailed out of a stricken C-46 in August 1943 in the Naga area of Burma; an area that contained not just Japanese troops, but tribes of head hunters as well. Among the twenty was CBS reporter Eric Sevareid. The men were located and supplies were dropped to them. The wing flight surgeon, Lt. Col. Don Flickinger, and two combat surgical technicians, Sgt. Richard S. Passey and Cpl. William G. MacKenzie, parachuted from the search planes to assist and care for the injured. At the same time, a ground team was sent to their location and all twenty walked to safety.

Although parachute rescues were not officially authorized at the time, this is considered by PJs to be the birth of Air Force pararescue. Eric Sevareid said of his rescuers: "Gallant is a precious word: they deserve it". A few short months later, Capt. Porter was killed on a rescue mission when his B-25 was shot down.

In 1944, General William H. Tunner took command of Air Transport Command operations in CBI. Declaring the rescue organization to be a 'cowboy operation', he appointed Maj. Donald C. Pricer commander of the 1352nd Army Air Force Base Unit and assigned him several aircraft for the mission. In addition to fixed-wing aircraft, early helicopters were deployed to the CBI for use in rescue, marking the start of a long association between rotary-wing aircraft and air rescue.

=== Post–World War II ===
Recognizing the need for a unified organization to perform search and rescue, the Army Air Force formed the Air Rescue Service (ARS). Officially established on 29 May 1946, the ARS was charged with saving the lives of aircrews who were involved in aircraft disasters, accidents, crash landings, ditchings or abandonments occurring away from an air base, and with being world-deployable to support far-flung air operations.

In the area around an air base, the air base commander had search and rescue jurisdiction through the Local Base Rescue (LBR) helicopter units. However, these were limited to a 135-mile (217 km) radius around the base due to the range and payload limitations of the aircraft. In order to reach beyond this limitation, Pararescue teams were authorized on 1 July 1947, with the first teams to be ready for fielding in November. Each team was to be composed of a Para-doctor and four Pararescue technicians trained in medicine, survival, rescue and tactics. Pararescue was given the mission of rescuing crews lost on long-range bomber and transport missions and to support other agencies when aerial rescue was requested.

A mission earlier in 1947 was the final impetus for the formal creation of Air Force Pararescue. In May, Dr. (Capt) Pope B. 'Doc' Holliday parachuted out of an OA-10 Catalina into the Nicaraguan jungle to aid a crewmember who had parachuted from a crippled B-17 Flying Fortress. His actions earned him the Bronze Star and made him another of Pararescue's early legends.

Shortly after Pararescue teams were authorized, the 5th Rescue Squadron conducted the first Pararescue and Survival School at MacDill Air Force Base in Florida. The core of instructors were experienced officers and enlisted men who were recruited from all branches of service. The commandant of that first school was pilot 1st Lieutenant Perry C. Emmons, who had been assigned to the Office of Strategic Services (OSS) during World War II. At the close of the war, Emmons and six sergeants flew prisoners of war out of Thailand, earning his group the nickname "Perry and the Pirates", after the popular comic strip Terry and the Pirates. After the war, Emmons completed Airborne School at Fort Benning, Georgia, becoming only the second jump-qualified Air Force pilot.

==== Clobbered Turkey ====
In late 1947, the crash of the B-29 "Clobbered Turkey" in Alaska brought home the need for specialized, well-trained Pararescuemen. On 21 December, the "Clobbered Turkey" hit a mountain and when the wreck was spotted on the 27th, Medical Corps 1st Lieutenant Albert C. Kinney, First Sergeant Santhell A. London, Air Force cold weather expert and T-5 Leon J. Casey—none of whom were trained Pararescuemen—volunteered to jump onto the crash site, located 95 miles north of Nome. The team encountered poor visibility, extreme temperatures and high winds on the site and as a result, all three died. Casey's body was found seven miles (11 km) from the crash site, swept there by the surface winds. Two members of the crew of the "Clobbered Turkey" who set out to seek assistance also died a few miles from the site. When civilian bush pilots William Munz and Frank Whaley finally arrived at the crash site two days later, they found that the remaining six members of the crew—who had stayed with the aircraft—had all survived. Dr. Kinney's body was not located until July of the next year.

In 1949, due to a shortage of available doctors, Medical Service Corps officers replaced Para-doctors on the teams, receiving the same training as the enlisted Pararescuemen. One of the first of these officers was John C. Shumate, a pharmacist, who was appointed commandant of the Pararescue and Survival School.

At this time the Air Rescue Specialist Course was created at the School of Aviation Medicine, Gunter Air Force Base, Alabama. Designed to teach Pararescuemen the skills needed to determine the nature and extent of injuries and to administer treatment, the course was taught by Medical Corps officers with previous Pararescue experience, including Dr. Pope B.'Doc' Holliday, Dr. Rufus Hessberg, Dr. Hamilton Blackshear, Dr. Randal W. Briggs and Dr. Burt Rowan.

=== Korean War ===
As Pararescue grew, PJ teams were assigned to every Air Rescue Service squadron to provide global coverage. By 1950, the unification of all the formerly independent Air Rescue Squadrons under the umbrella of the Air Rescue Service was complete.

In 1950, North Korea attacked across the 38th parallel and began the Korean War. This was an opportunity for Air Rescue to put training into practice and to develop theories into policies. One of the key new concepts was rescue of stranded personnel from behind enemy lines. This, along with evacuating critically wounded men from aid stations close to the front, were Air Rescue's primary missions.

Pararescuemen were a normal part of Air Rescue crews for these missions. Their medical and tactical skills made them invaluable for evacuation and rescue missions of this type.

Pararescuemen were often called upon to leave the helicopters that carried them in order to assist the personnel they were sent to rescue. This might call for an extended stay behind enemy lines and overland travel of several miles. The longest of these 'Lone Wolf' missions lasted seventy-two hours.

By the end of the war in 1953, Air Rescue had evacuated over eight thousand critical casualties and rescued nearly a thousand men from behind enemy lines.

=== Vietnam War ===
The Vietnam War was a pivotal conflict for the Pararescue teams. The Air Force's scope of operations became so large that demand for Pararescue teams expanded as well. The use of helicopters caused new tactics utilizing the speed, distance, and support they could provide. Rescue "packages" were created utilizing FACs (Forward Air Controllers), rescue escorts (such as AH-1 Cobras or A-1 Sandys), protective fighter CAP (Combat Air Patrol), HC-130 "King" Hercules for Rescue Mission Coordination and helicopter refueling, and the HH-3 Jolly Green Giant, HH-43 Huskie, and HH-53 Super Jolly Green Giant helicopters to provide fast rescue for pilots shot down far behind enemy lines. An elite corps of USAF Firefighters, Airborne Rescuemen/Firefighters, were part of these rescue operations. Pararescue personnel were part of these packages to provide medical assistance for injured aircrew as well as the ability to patrol for missing aircrew that might have been unconscious or dead.

Pararescue team members would be inserted to conduct LSO (Limited Surface Operations) searches while the escorts maintained an aggressive patrol to provide instantaneous support. Sometimes they would be inserted to search for personnel who were being forced to escape and evade; in such cases the mission might last for days. The Pararescue teams racked up an impressive record; during the conflict, only 19 aircrew were awarded the Air Force Cross. Ten of those were awarded to Pararescue forces.

=== Modern era ===
Pararescuemen have continued to play an integral part in the US military in Iraq, Afghanistan during the Global War on Terror, the 2026 Iran war and beyond. Deploying with other Special Operations Forces (SOF) teams, Pararescuemen continue to fight and save lives on the battlefield.

== Training and structure ==
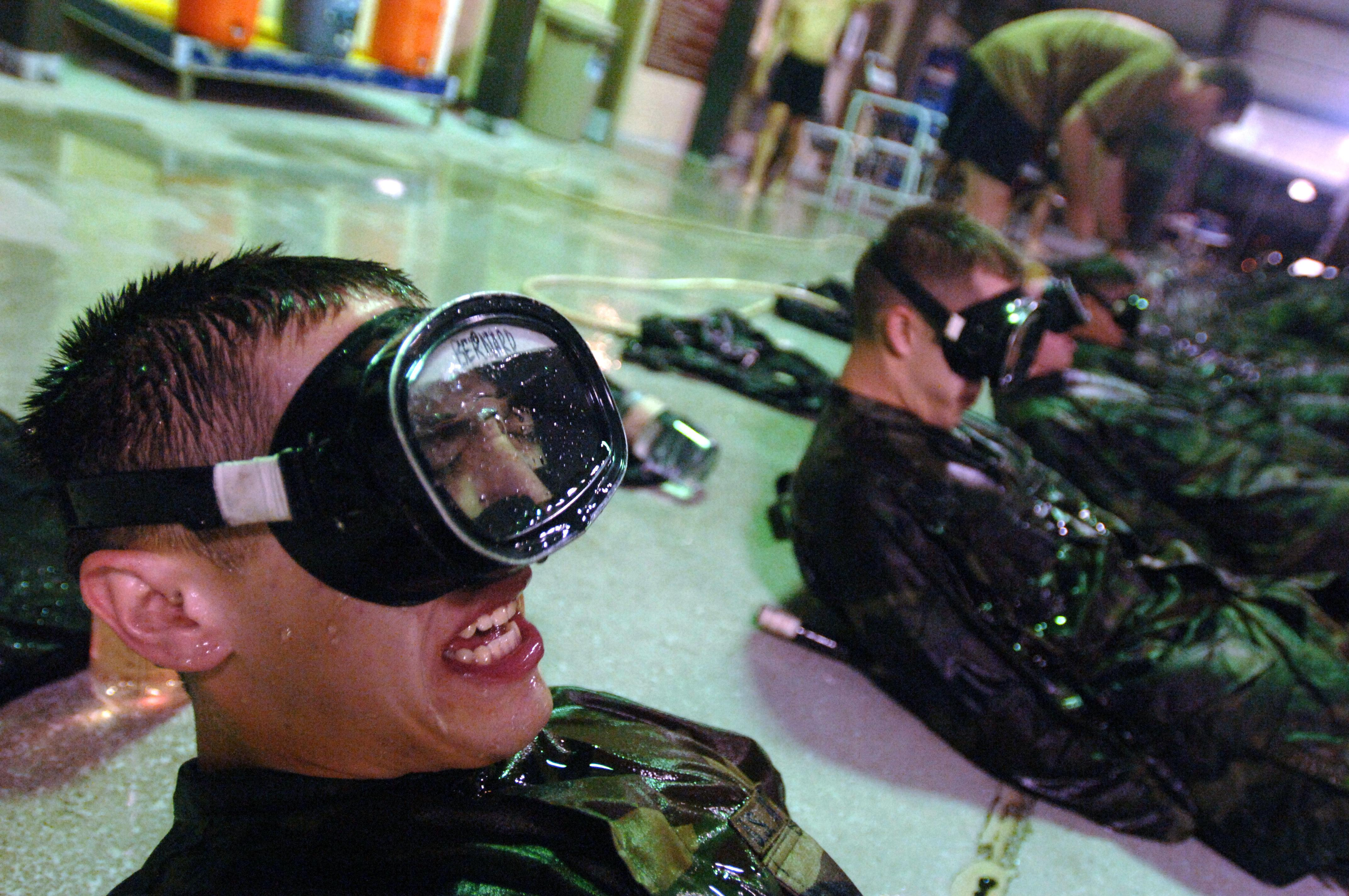
Airmen wear water-filled masks while performing over one thousand flutter kicks after 20 hours of non-stop physical training during an extended training day at the Pararescue Indoctrination Training Center.

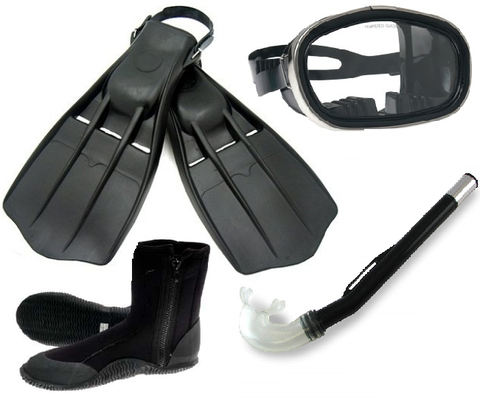
Pararescue Indoctrination Course Training Gear

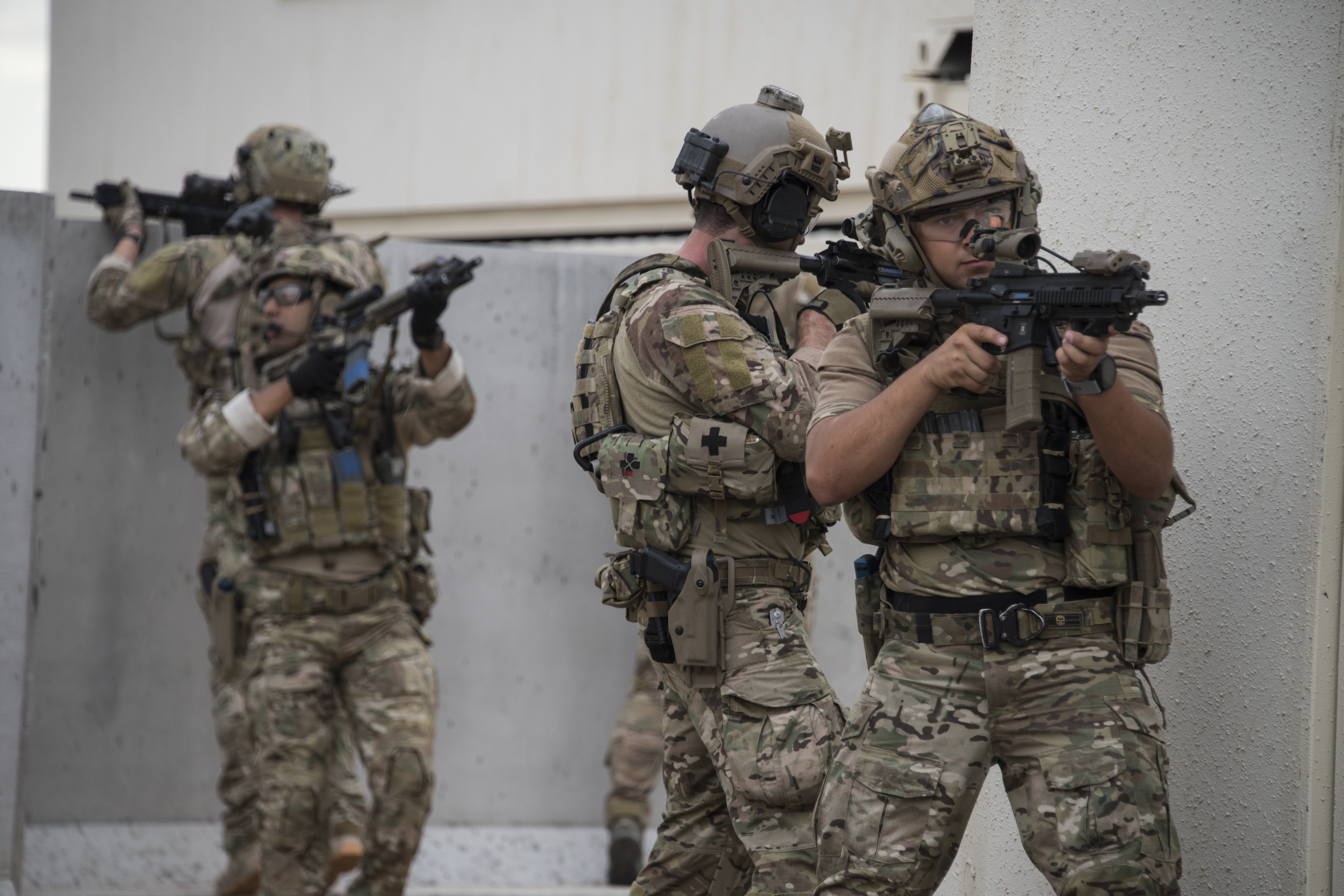
Aircrew taking the Combat Team Member Course aim their weapons during training at Davis-Monthan Air Force Base, Arizona

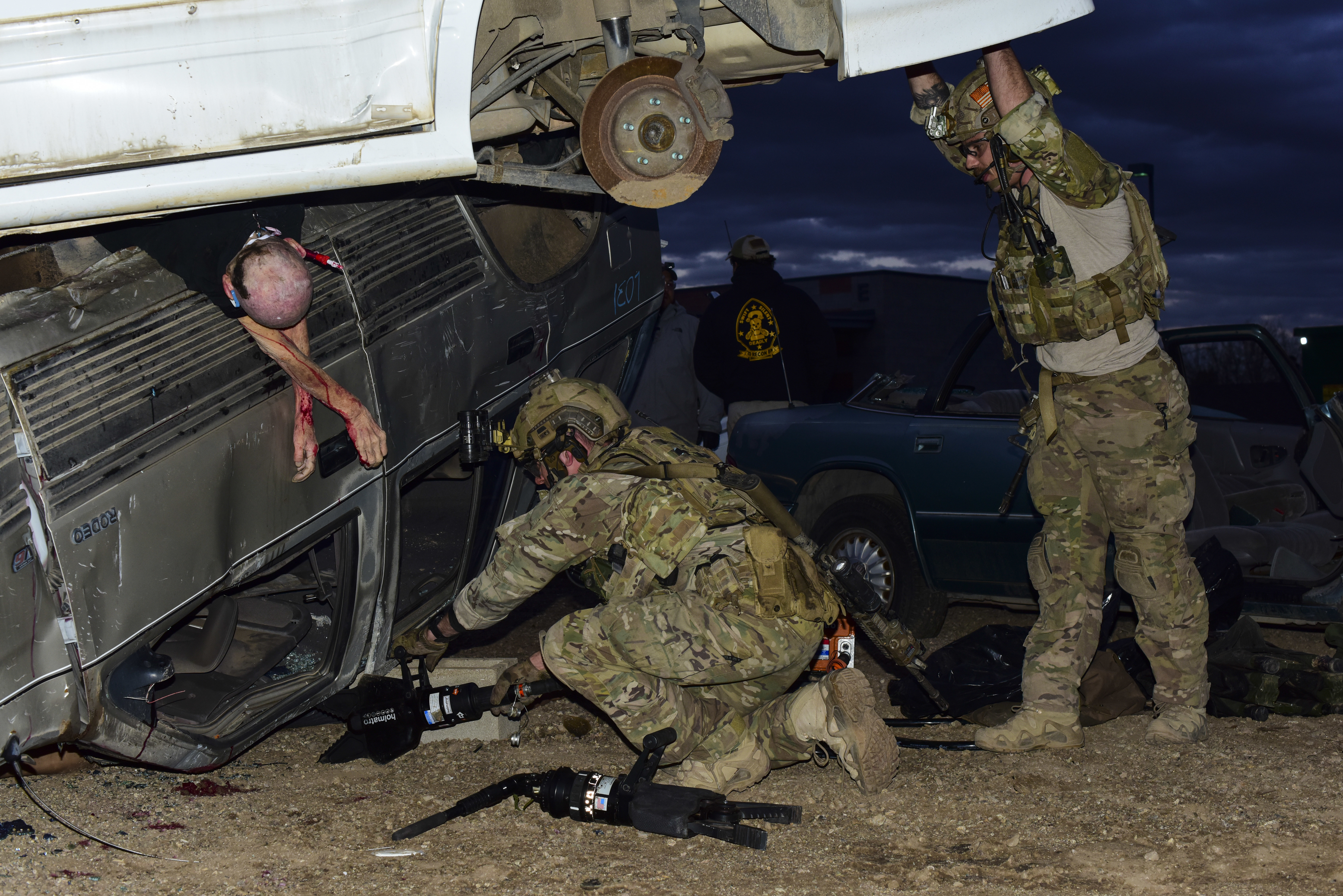
Pararescuemen from the 48th Rescue Squadron prepare to extricate a simulated patient from between two vehicles during Razor’s Edge 2018 at the Northwest Fire District Training Center in Marana, Ariz. During the exercise, cadavers were used for the simulated patients for training realism.

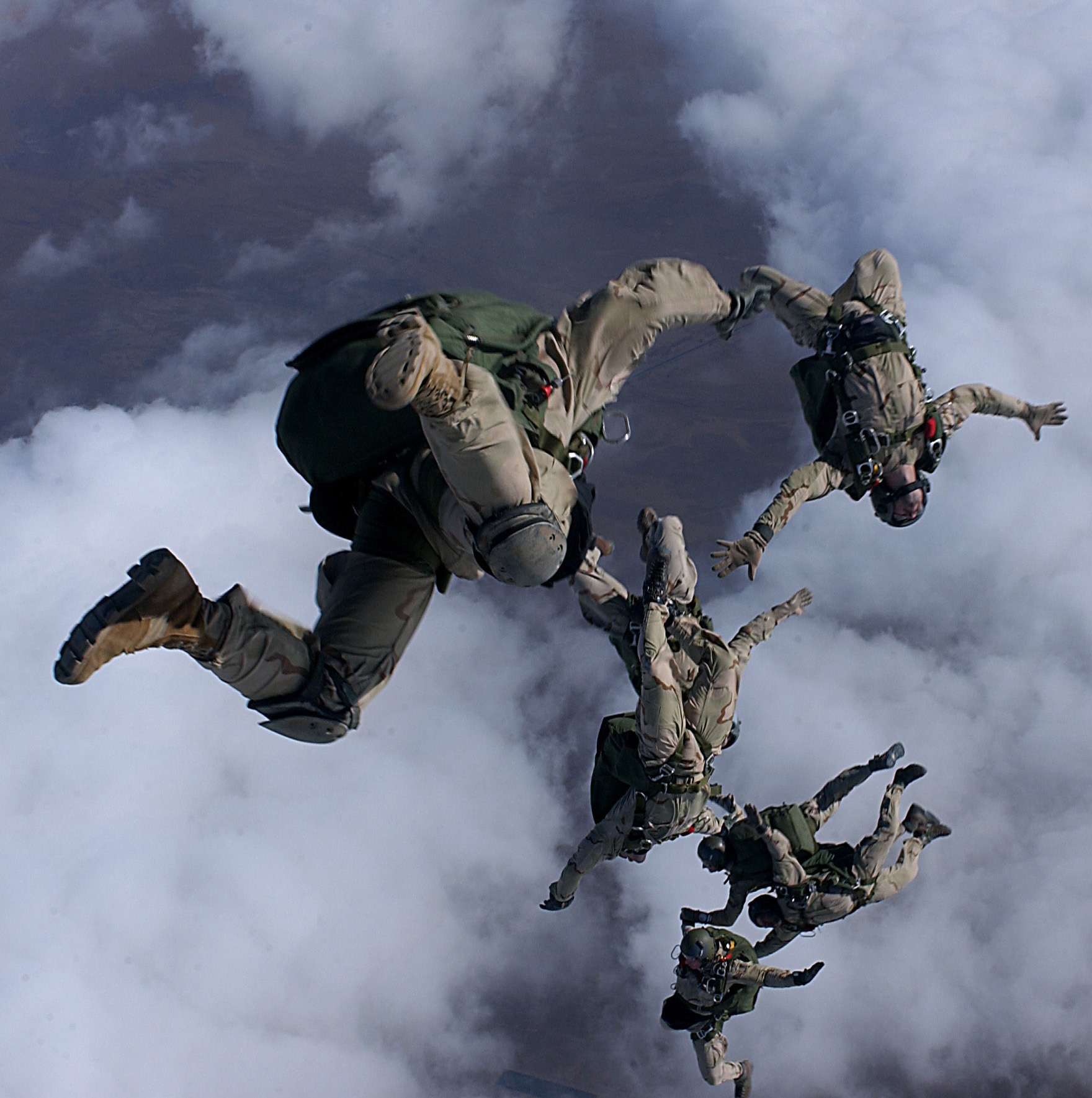
Air Force Pararescuemen jump from an HC-130P/N in support of Operation Enduring Freedom.

The process of becoming a PJ is known informally as "Superman School". At almost two years long, the training pipeline is among the longest special operations training courses in the world. It also has one of the highest training attrition rates in the entire U.S. special operations community, at around 80%.

Pararescue trainees are first required to complete United States Air Force Basic Military Training at Lackland AFB, then they are required to pass the Special Warfare Preparatory Course and Special Warfare Assessment and Selection at Lackland AFB (replacing the previous Pararescue Indoctrination Course). Following that is a long string of courses including Combat Dive School, Army Airborne, National Registry for Paramedic, Survival (SERE-C), and Military Free-fall Parachutist. Upon completing the aforementioned, a pararescue trainee is required to then complete the Pararescue Apprentice Course, which combines all the prior skills and adds a few more. Once a Pararescueman has completed the pipeline, he is assigned to a Rescue or Special Tactics team as per the needs of the Air Force. Graduates assigned to Rescue Squadrons will receive on-the-job operational upgrade training. Graduates assigned to Special Tactics Squadrons attend portions of Advanced Skills Training at the Special Tactics Training Squadron along with Air Force Combat Controllers in order to complete most of their operational upgrade training.

- Special Warfare Preparatory Course (SW Prep), Lackland AFB, Texas (8 weeks)

This course is designed to give candidates the best possible chance of getting through selection. They are coached in collegiate-level strength/conditioning, running, swimming, nutrition, physical therapy, and other specialties. This course is currently only for Non-Prior Service aircrew, while Prior Service aircrew attend a condensed two-week course.

Indoctrination Course (currently A&S) Training Gear is essentially made up of a high volume face mask, a silicone snorkel, rocket fins and booties. The mask and snorkel are key throughout training, being used in water confidence training such as water inserted into the mask throughout the training, simulating the effect of being underwater regardless of whether submerged or not. Mask and snorkel recovery is a key portion that is tested on, in which the trainee has to recover the mask and snorkel from the deep end of the pool, "clearing" the mask of water while still submerged and "clearing" the snorkel of water as well. These two can be referred to as key training tools. Items such as rope and booties can be used to further increase the intensity of water confidence training.

- Special Warfare Assessment and Selection (A&S), Lackland AFB, Texas (4 weeks)

This is the actual selection course, where aspiring PJs will learn water confidence techniques, rehabilitation, physical conditioning, running, and nutrition, among other vital skills. A&S is divided into two segments: Field Phase and Selection Phase; Field Phase (2.5 weeks): Time is spent in the field, sleeping in makeshift lodging in cots with sleeping bags. Pool work consisting of surface swimming, water confidence, running, rucking (walking with a loaded backpack), grass & guerrilla drills, calisthenics, and extended training days. Selection Phase (1.5 weeks): Candidates will be administered tests, surveys, critiques, and interviews. Instructors will compile all relevant information and select only those candidates that meet the required standards.

The course is extremely demanding, candidates are pushed to their physical and mental limits, with an attrition rate of about 75 percent.

- Army Airborne School, Fort Benning, Georgia (3 weeks)

Students learn the basic parachuting skills required to infiltrate an objective area by static line airdrop. This course includes ground operations week, tower week, and "jump week" when participants make five parachute jumps. Personnel who complete this training are awarded the basic parachutist rating and are allowed to wear the Parachutist Badge.

- Special Warfare Combat Dive Course, Navy Diving and Salvage Training Center, Naval Support Activity Panama City, Florida (8 weeks)

The course is divided into four blocks of instruction: (1) Diving Theory, (2) Infiltration/Exfiltration Methods, (3) Open Circuit Diving Operations, and (4) Closed Circuit Diving Operations. The primary focus of AFCDC is to develop Pararescuemen/Combat Rescue Officers and Combat Controller/Special Tactics Officers into competent, capable and safe combat divers/swimmers. The course provides commanders with divers/swimmers capable of undertaking personnel recovery and special operations waterborne missions. AFCDC provides diver training through classroom instruction, extensive physical training, surface and sub-surface water confidence pool exercises, pool familiarization dives, day/night tactical open water surface/sub-surface infiltration swims, open/closed circuit diving procedures and underwater search and recovery procedures. The session culminates with a waterborne field training exercise.

- Army Military Free Fall Parachutist School, Fort Bragg, North Carolina, and Yuma Proving Ground, Arizona (4 weeks)

This course instructs free fall parachuting (HALO) using a high performance parafoil. The course provides wind tunnel training, in-air instruction focusing on student stability, aerial maneuvers, air sense and parachute opening procedures. Each student undertakes a minimum of 30 free fall jumps including two day and two night jumps with supplemental oxygen, rucksack and load-bearing equipment.

- Survival, Evasion, Resistance and Escape (SERE), Fairchild AFB, (3 weeks)

This course teaches basic survival techniques for remote areas using minimal equipment. This includes instruction of principles, procedures, equipment and techniques that help individuals to survive, regardless of climatic conditions or unfriendly environments, and return home. Also includes Underwater Egress Training (1 day) at Naval Air Station Pensacola, Florida, this course teaches how to safely escape from an aircraft that has landed in the water. Instruction includes principles, procedures, and techniques necessary to escape a sinking aircraft.

- Pararescue EMT-Paramedic Training, Kirtland Air Force Base, New Mexico (37 weeks)

This course teaches how to manage trauma patients prior to evacuation and provide emergency medical treatment. Phase I is seven weeks of emergency medical technician basic (EMT-B) training. Phase II (EMT-P) lasts 30 weeks and provides advanced medical training and instruction in minor field surgery, pharmacology, combat trauma management, advanced airway management, and military evacuation procedures. Graduates of the course are awarded National Registry of Emergency Medical Technicians-Paramedic (NREMT-P) certification.

- Pararescue Apprentice Course, Kirtland Air Force Base, New Mexico (22 weeks)

This is the culmination of approximately two years of pararescue training. This course includes field medical care and tactics, mountaineering, shooting, combat tactics, advanced parachuting, and helicopter insertion/extraction qualifications. Upon successful completion of this course, each graduate is awarded the maroon beret and qualifies aircrew as pararescue recovery specialists for assignment to any Pararescue unit worldwide.

- Continuation Training

After the new PJ arrives at their first unit, training continues for another 450 days. This is called a progression tour. An instructor will be with the new PJ at all times until they've completed this training. Much of it covers the same skills learned during initial "pipeline" training but to a higher proficiency level. This training will qualify the new PJ to work as an element leader, in charge of a two-person PJ team on a helicopter.

PJs will also attend medical refresher courses to keep them current as National Registry of Emergency Medical Technicians. PJs will experience two-week hospital internships in the emergency department, labor and delivery, surgical intensive care, pediatric emergency department, operating room, and a two-week ambulance rotation with an assignment to an Advanced Life Support EMS unit responsible for responding to a variety of 911 emergency calls.

=== Pararescue and Advanced Pararescue Orientation Course ===
Since the 1950s, Air Force Pararescueman have provided training and mentorship for Civil Air Patrol cadets. This was formalized in 1977 with the introduction of Pararescue Orientation Course (PJOC) at Kirtland AFB, New Mexico. PJOC was later taught at Fort Knox, Kentucky and George Washington National Forest, Virginia. The course is one of the hardest national cadet special activities and teaches CAP cadets fundamental survival and rescue skills such as shelter building, land navigation, and rock climbing. Advanced Pararescue Orientation Course (APJOC) began in the 1980s and was taught only at Kirtland AFB. In 2003, both programs were cancelled. PJOC returned in 2004, but APJOC did not see its return until 2008 when the course was moved to Davis-Monthan AFB, Arizona. APJOC builds upon the skills learned at PJOC and exposes cadets to life in an operational Pararescue or Special Tactics Squadron. The course culminates with a Combat Rescue Training Exercise. During APJOC, both PJOC and APJOC are Civil Air Patrol National Cadet Special Activities provided by United States Air Force Pararescue.

== Traditions ==
=== Pararescue Creed ===
It is my duty as a Pararescueman to save life and to aid the injured. I will be prepared at all times to perform my assigned duties quickly and efficiently, placing these duties before personal desires and comforts. These things we (I) do, that others may live.

Originally titled "The Code of the Air Rescueman", it was penned by the first commander of the Air Rescue Service, (then) Lieutenant Colonel Richard T. Kight and is also still used by the Air Force Rescue Coordination Center (AFRCC).

=== Green Feet ===
This tradition arose during the Vietnam War, at which time the most commonly used USAF helicopter was the CH-3E, nicknamed the Jolly Green Giant due to its enormous size and olive drab exterior. The tradition came about when pilots, navigators, enlisted aircrew, or other military personnel were in need of rescue. After these personnel were rescued, they would proceed to receive the temporary ink-stamped "tattoo" of the green feet on their buttocks due to the fact that the Para Jumpers "saved their ass."

=== Origin of term "Pararescue Jumper" ===
The term "Pararescue Jumper" is a retronym of the initials "PJ", representing the Military Duty Identifiers P=Parachutist and J=Diver that were used on an Air Force Form 5 (Aircrew Flight Log) to identify anyone who is on board in order to jump from the aircraft. Pararescuemen originally had no "in-flight" duties and were listed only as "PJ" on the Form 5. The pararescue position eventually grew to include duties as an aerial gunner and scanner on rotary wing aircraft, a duty now performed by aerial gunners. Currently, aircrew qualified Pararescuemen are recorded using aircrew position identifier "J" ("Pararescue Member") on the AFTO form 781.

=== Maroon Beret ===
The maroon beret worn by Pararescuemen and Combat Rescue Officers was authorized by HQ USAF in 1966 and is the second beret to be authorized for universal wear, after the U.S. Army Special Forces Beret. The beret symbolizes the blood sacrificed by fellow Pararescuemen and their devotion to duty by aiding others in distress.

=== Pararescue Flash ===
The flash is a variant of the original Air Rescue Service emblem that was designed by Bill Steffens and implemented in 1952. The significance of the original ARS emblem is described as follows:

The angel holding the globe is emblematic of protection and rescue from danger. The red robe is significant of the valor with which the Air Rescue Service carries on its humanitarian mission. The blue shield is indicative of the sky which is the field of operations and the golden light represents a ray of hope for those in need of the Air Rescue Service.

== Notable pararescuemen ==
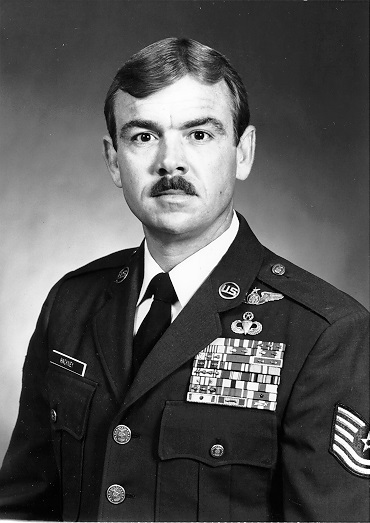
Duane Hackney, the most decorated enlisted man in history of the U.S. Air Force

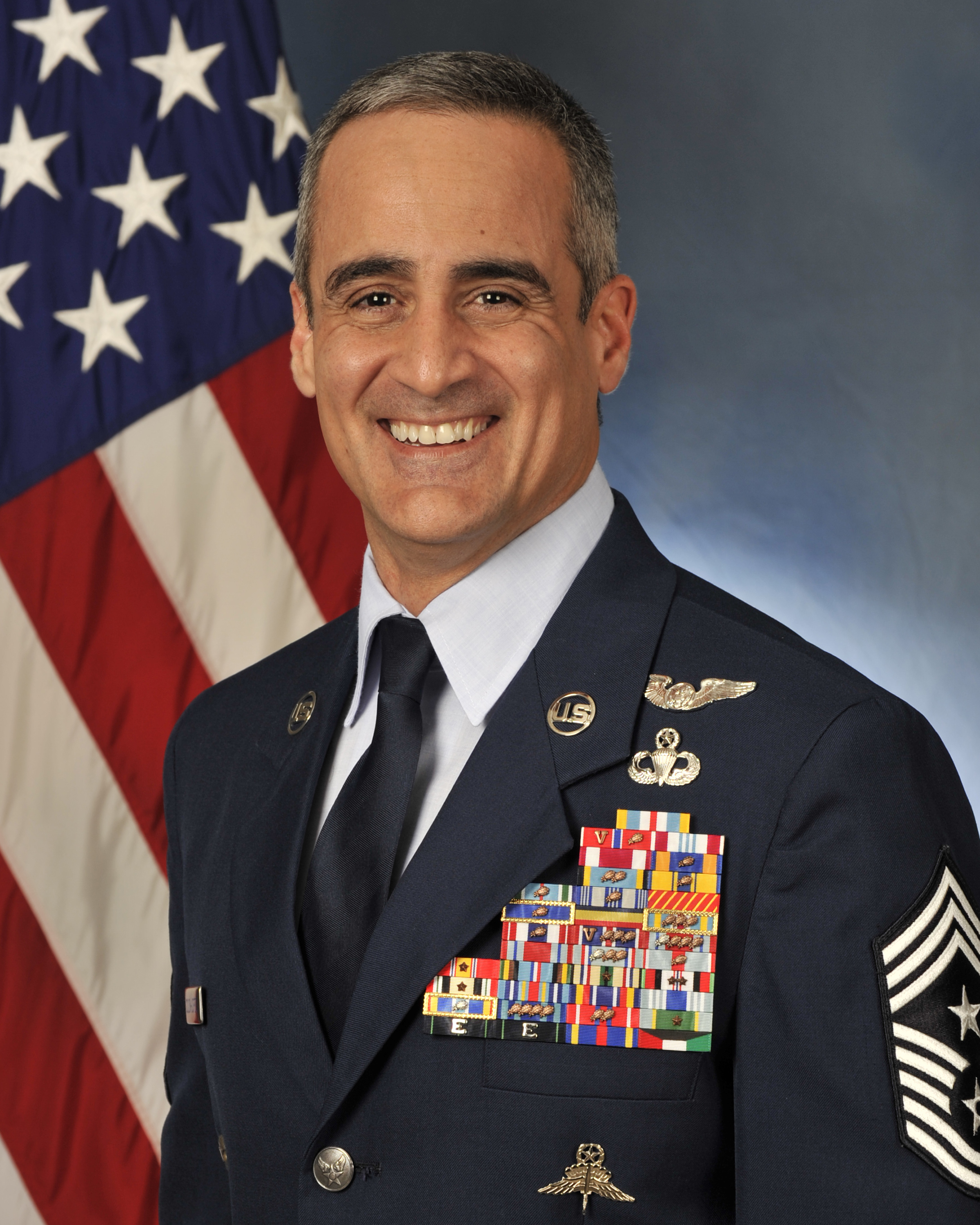
Ramón Colón-López, formerly the 4th Senior Enlisted Advisor to the Chairman of the Joint Chiefs of Staff

- Ramón Colón-López, Senior Enlisted Advisor to the Chairman (SEAC), was one of the first six airmen to be awarded the newly created Air Force Combat Action Medal in 2007. He was also an interim Commandant of the Pararescue and Combat Rescue Officer School at Kirtland AFB. He would later serve as 4th Senior Enlisted Advisor to the Chairman of the Joint Chiefs of Staff.
- Jason Cunningham, Senior Airman, was posthumously awarded the Air Force Cross for actions on 4 March 2002, during the Battle of Takur Ghar. Technical Sergeant Kerry Miller's Silver Star was upgraded to the Air Force Cross for actions as the Combat Search and Rescue Team Leader on 4 March 2002, during the Battle of Takur Ghar.
- Scott Fales, Master Sergeant, was a recipient of the Silver Star for his heroic action in the Battle of Mogadishu, Mogadishu, Somalia, in 1993. In addition Retired Air Force Master Sgt. and pararescueman Scott Fales received U.S. Special Operations Command’s highest honor when he was awarded the 2012 Bull Simons Award in Tampa, Florida, 23 May. Fales was also recognized by the Jolly Green’s Association performing "Rescue of the Year" twice in his career and in 1992 he was one of the Air Force's 12 Outstanding Airman.
- Wayne Fisk, Technical Sergeant, earned a Silver Star for his role in the Son Tay Prison raid in November 1970, and another Silver Star for participating in the SS Mayaguez rescue in May 1975. During the Mayaguez rescue, Fisk was the last U.S. serviceman to personally engage the enemy in Southeast Asia. Other medals earned during his five tours in Vietnam include the Defense Superior Service Medal, the Legion of Merit, the Distinguished Flying Cross with Oak Leaf Cluster, the Meritorious Service Medal with oak leaf cluster, and the Air Medal with 17 oak leaf clusters.
- Duane D. Hackney, Airman Second Class, was awarded the Air Force Cross for actions while recovering a downed pilot in North Vietnam, on 6 February 1967. He is also the most decorated enlisted man in the history of the U.S. Air Force with 24 awards for valor and more than 70 awards and decorations in all.
- Jon K. Hoberg, Technical Sergeant, earned a Silver Star for his role in the Son Tay Prison raid in November 1970.
- Larry W. Maysey, Sergeant, was awarded the Air Force Cross for actions in a night recovery of an infiltration team in which several recovery aircraft—including his own—were shot down in Southeast Asia on 9 November 1967.
- Josh Appel, Captain, and Christopher Piercecchi, Technical Sergeant, were the pararescue team who recovered Navy SEAL Marcus Luttrell and his Afghan rescuer from a village the SEAL had sought shelter in. Luttrell had been seriously wounded and the rest of his team were killed in a firefight with Taliban fighters during Operation Red Wings. Several days later, they also retrieved bodies of Luttrell's teammates. Appel later worked as an emergency room physician. Piercecchi received the Pat Tillman 2011 scholarship and also completed medical school, eventually specializing in thoracic surgery. (Note: Appel had graduated from University of Arizona College of Medicine shortly before the rescue mission. Years later, when Piercecchi also graduated from the same medical school, Appel hooded him at the ceremony.)
- William H. Pitsenbarger, Airman First Class, was posthumously awarded the Air Force Cross for his actions during the Vietnam War. His medal was later upgraded to the Medal of Honor.
- Arden "Rick" Smith, Tech Sergeant, of the New York Air National Guard was lost at sea during the events chronicled in the Sebastian Junger book The Perfect Storm after the helicopter he was in was unable to refuel and had to ditch in the ocean.
- Tim Wilkinson, Technical Sergeant, was the first recipient of the Air Force Cross since the Vietnam War for his actions during the 1993 Battle of Mogadishu. Wilkinson was portrayed by Ty Burrell in the 2001 film Black Hawk Down which chronicled the events of the Battle of Mogadishu.
- Wil Willis, Staff Sergeant, (former U.S. Army Ranger) was the star of a Military Channel show entitled Special Ops Mission and later served as the host of Triggers: Weapons That Changed the World on that same network. Willis has also appeared as a weapons expert on the History Channel's Top Shot, and is the host of Forged in Fire.
- Ivan Ruiz, Master Sergeant, was a PJ of the 22nd Special Tactics Squadron who received the Air Force Cross on December 10th, 2013 for his actions in saving the lives of two of his teammates while contributing to 11 Insurgents killed.

== Units ==
=== Active duty units ===
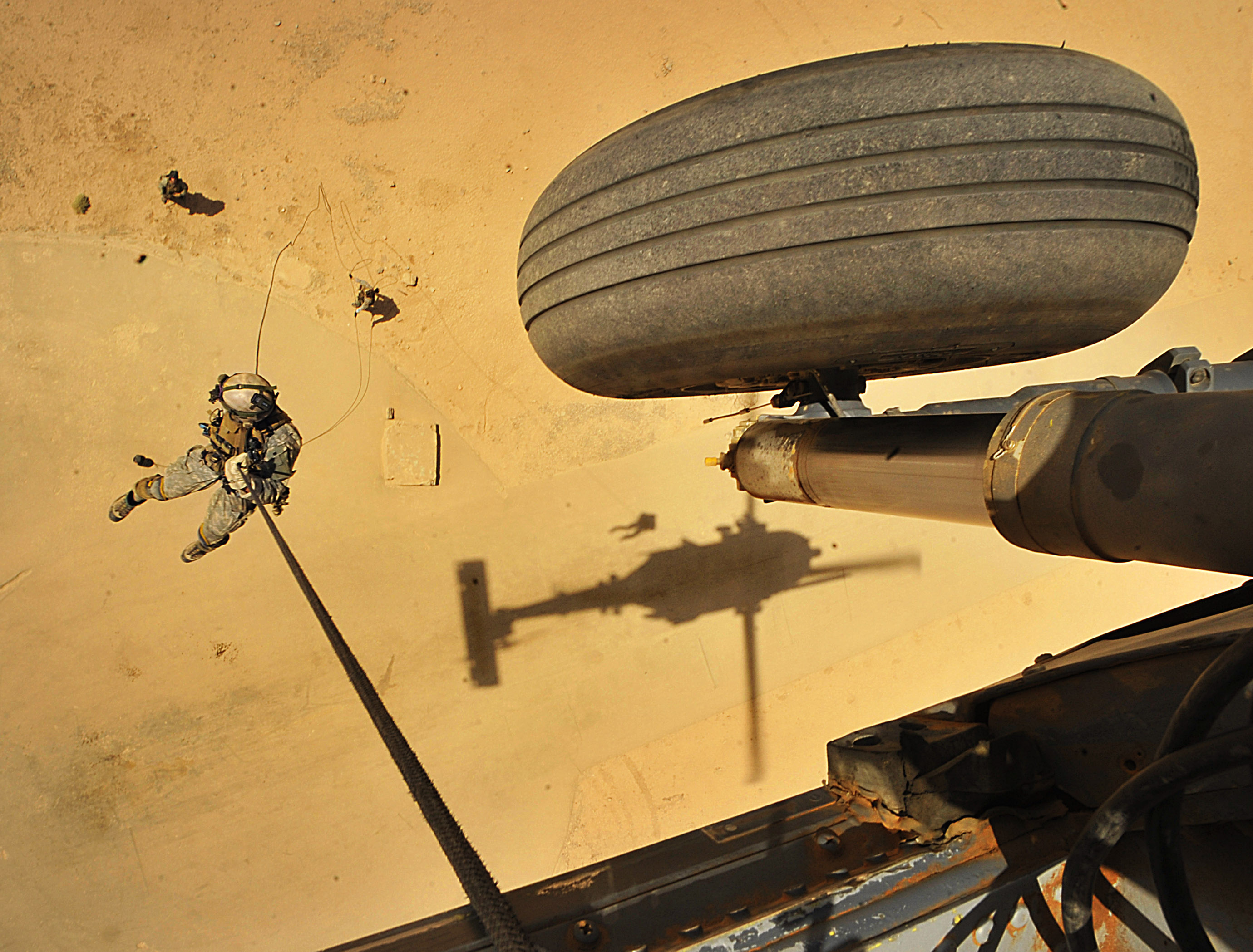
Pararescueman rappels from a helicopter during operational training in Iraq

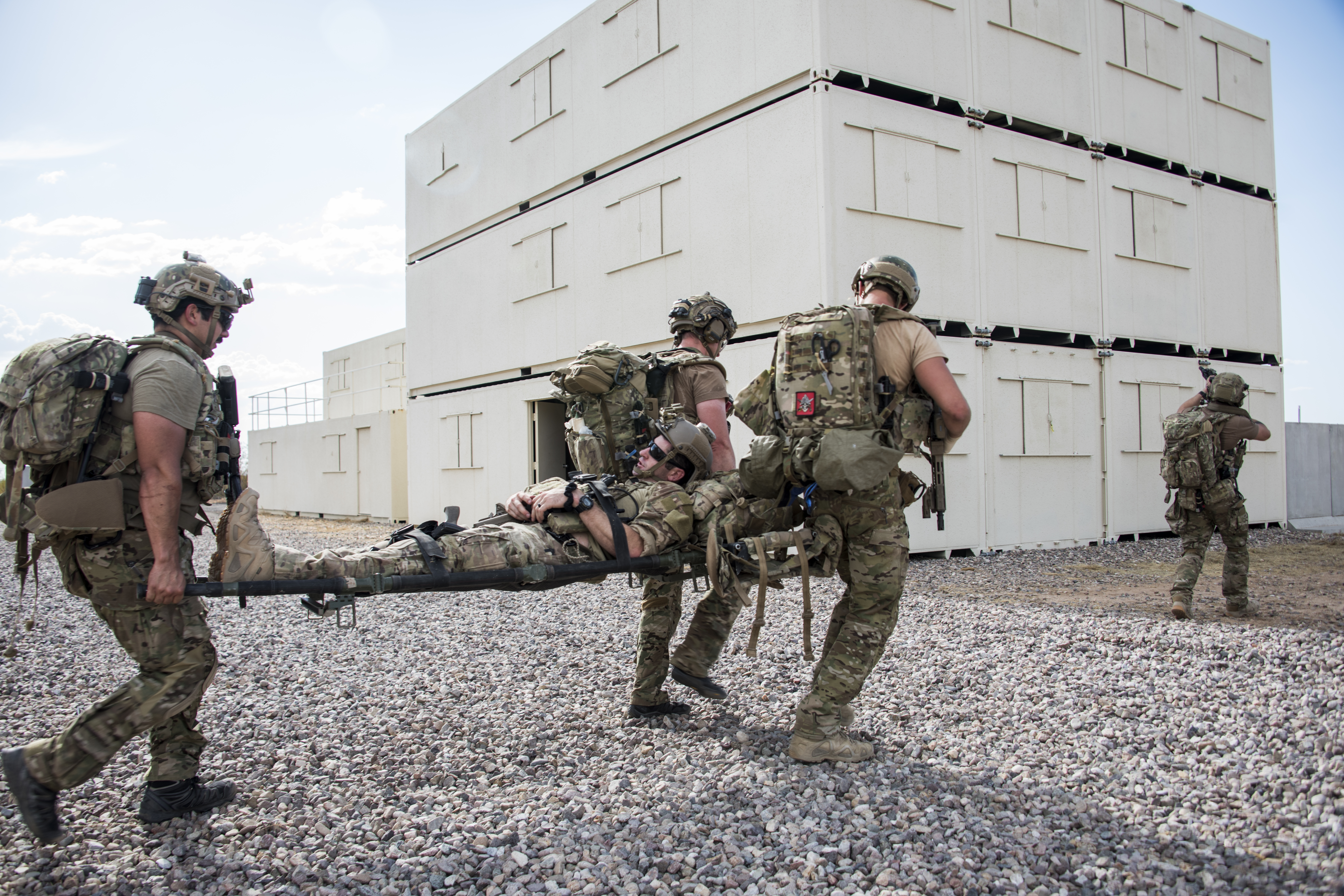
Airmen in the Combat Team Member Course carry a simulated injured person during training at Davis-Monthan Air Force Base, Arizona

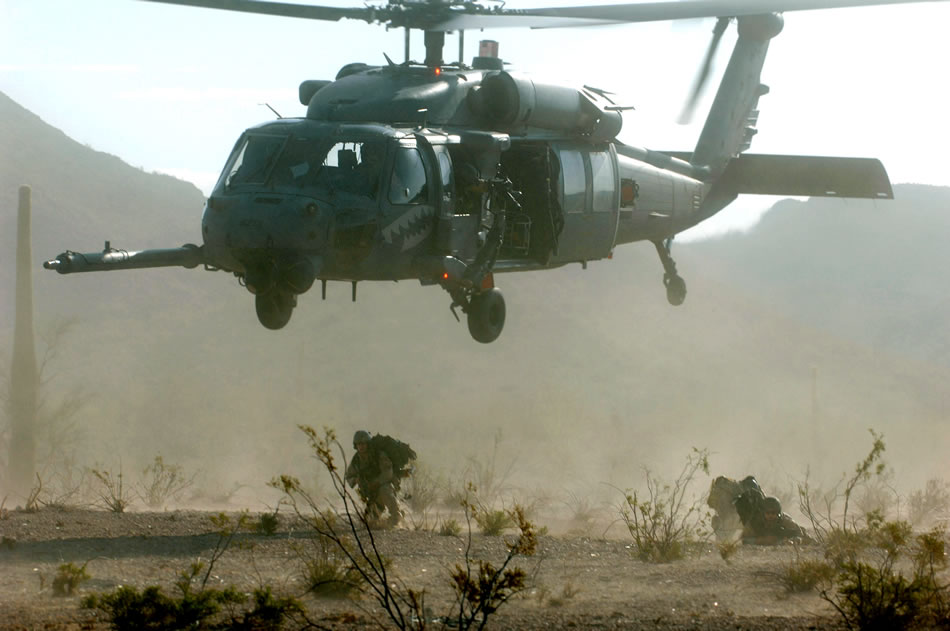
Pararescuemen secure an area after dropping out of an HH-60 Pave Hawk helicopter during Exercise Angel Thunder 16 July at Gila Bend, Ariz.

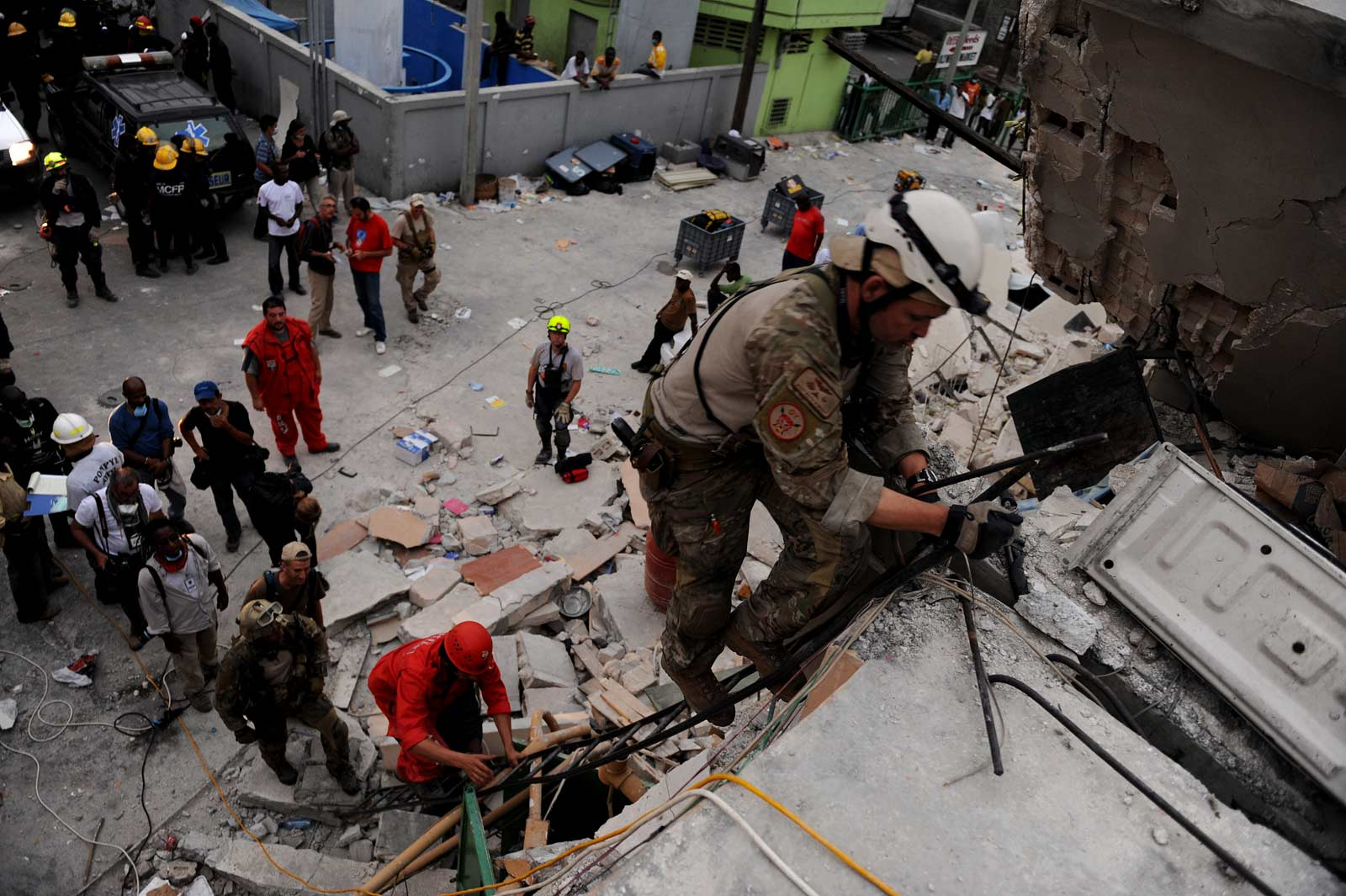
A PJ searching the rubble of Port-au-Prince for survivors in the aftermath of the 2010 earthquake

- Air Combat Command
  - 23rd Wing
    - 347th Rescue Group—Moody Air Force Base, Georgia
      - 38th Rescue Squadron
    - 563rd Rescue Group—Davis-Monthan Air Force Base, Arizona
      - 48th Rescue Squadron
      - 58th Rescue Squadron—Nellis Air Force Base, Nevada
- Pacific Air Forces
  - 18th Wing—Kadena Air Base, Okinawa, Japan
    - 31st Rescue Squadron
- United States Air Forces in Europe
  - 31st Fighter Wing--Aviano Air Base, Italy
    - 31st Operations Group
      - 57th Rescue Squadron
- Air Force Special Operations Command
  - 24th Special Operations Wing, Hurlburt Field, Florida
    - 720th Special Tactics Group, Hurlburt Field, Florida
      - 21st Special Tactics Squadron, Pope Field, North Carolina
      - 22nd Special Tactics Squadron, Joint Base Lewis-McChord (McChord Air Force Base), Washington
      - 23rd Special Tactics Squadron, Hurlburt Field, Florida
      - 26th Special Tactics Squadron, Cannon Air Force Base, New Mexico
    - 724th Special Tactics Group, Pope Field, North Carolina
      - 24th Special Tactics Squadron, Pope Field, North Carolina
  - 353d Special Operations Group, Kadena Air Base, Japan
    - 320th Special Tactics Squadron, Kadena Air Base, Japan
  - 352d Special Operations Wing, RAF Mildenhall, United Kingdom
    - 321st Special Tactics Squadron, RAF Mildenhall, United Kingdom

=== Air National Guard units ===
U.S. Air National Guard Pararescueman from the 106th Rescue Wing rescues families from Hurricane Harvey

- Air National Guard
  - Operationally Gained by Air Combat Command
    - 106th Rescue Wing—Francis S. Gabreski Air National Guard Base (New York Air National Guard)
      - 103rd Rescue Squadron
    - 129th Rescue Wing—Moffett Federal Airfield (California Air National Guard)
      - 131st Rescue Squadron
  - Operationally Gained by Air Force Special Operations Command
    - 123d Airlift Wing—Louisville IAP (Kentucky Air National Guard)
      - 123rd Special Tactics Squadron
    - 142nd Fighter Wing—Portland International Airport (Oregon Air National Guard)
      - 125th Special Tactics Squadron
  - Operationally Gained by Pacific Air Forces
    - 176th Wing—Joint Base Elmendorf-Richardson (Alaska Air National Guard)
      - 176th Operations Group
        - 212th Rescue Squadron

=== Air Force Reserve Command units ===
- Air Force Reserve Command
  - Operationally Gained by Air Combat Command
    - 920th Rescue Wing—Patrick Space Force Base, Florida
      - 920th Operations Group
        - 308th Rescue Squadron
        - 304th Rescue Squadron—Portland International Airport/Portland Air National Guard Base, Oregon
      - 943rd Rescue Group—Davis-Monthan Air Force Base, Arizona
        - 306th Rescue Squadron—Davis-Monthan Air Force Base, Arizona

=== Former units ===
- 57th Air Rescue and Recovery Squadron—Lajes Field, Azores (inactivated on 1 December 1972)

== See also ==
- Joint Personnel Recovery Agency
- List of United States Air Force rescue squadrons
- List of United States Air Force special tactics squadrons
- Para-SAR
- Rescue swimmer
- Royal Air Force Mountain Rescue Service
- Special warfare combatant-craft crewmen
- Unit 669
- United States Coast Guard Rescue Swimmers
- United States Air Force Combat Rescue Officer
- United States Special Operations Forces
