= United States Air Force Security Forces Shield =

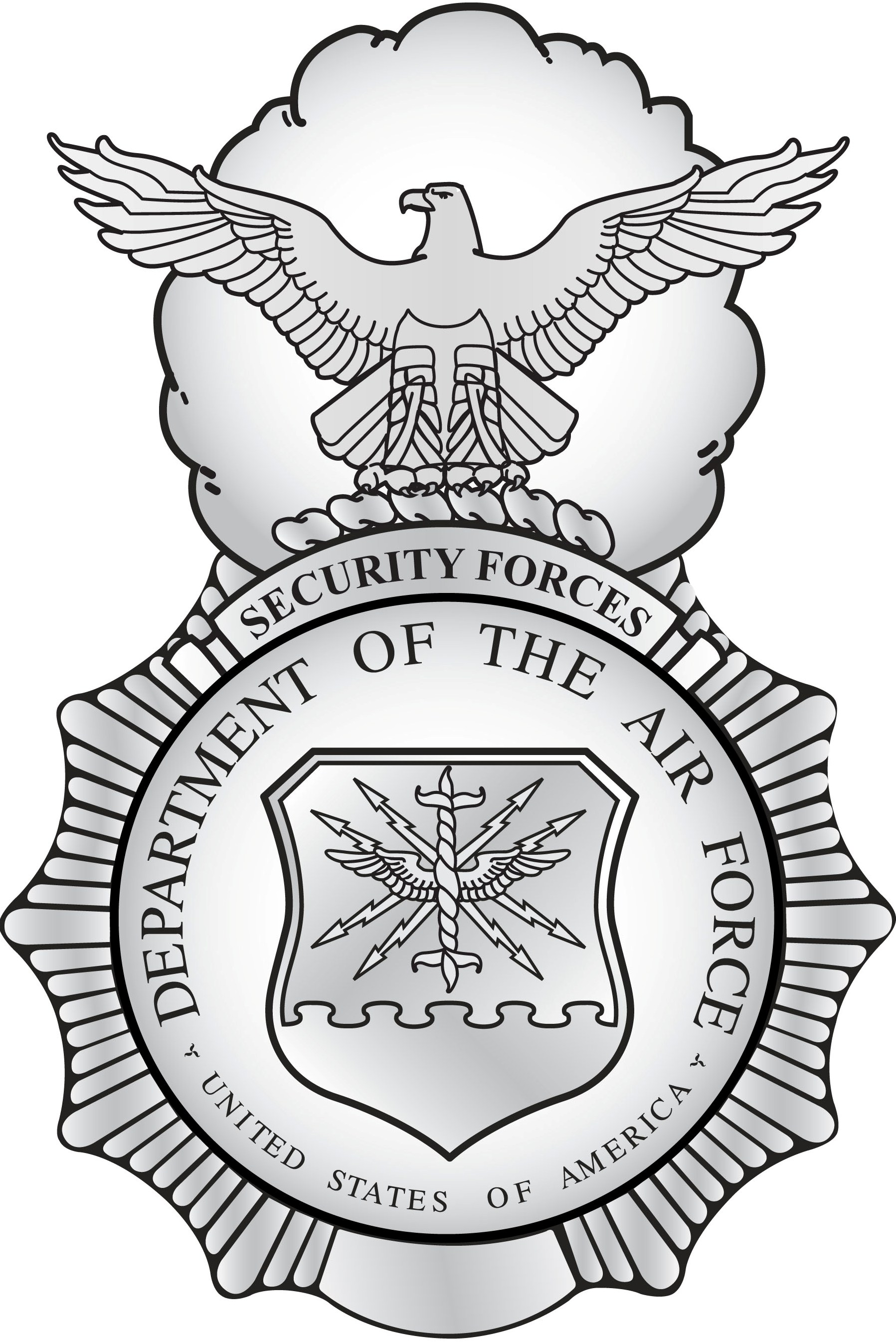
U.S. Air Force Security Forces Shield (The words "Security Forces" are located just below the eagle

The Air Force Security Forces Shield is a military badge of the United States Air Force Security Forces. Originally known as the "Air Police Shield" and the "Security Police Shield," the Air Force Security Forces Shield has existed since the early 1960s. The shield is worn in the center of the left breast pocket of all Air Force uniforms, or in an approximately equivalent location if the uniform does not have breast pockets. For females in dress uniforms, the shield is worn above the name tag on the wearer’s right side. The shield is usually not worn on the OCP uniform, being substituted by the "SF" brassard patch on the wearer's left arm. The Security Forces Shield placed in the same location, in a subdued tone with or without an OCP background is an acceptable alternative as well. The Security Forces shield is the primary identification for officers and enlisted members of the Air Force Security Forces.

The Air Force Security Forces Shield is considered a symbol of legal authority and Force Protection on Air Force Installations. The shield is awarded to all Security Forces members upon graduation from the Security Forces Academy.

A similar decoration to the Air Force Security Forces shield is the Air Force Fire Protection Badge.

== History ==
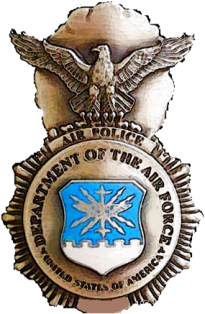
Former U.S. Air Force Air Police Shield (The words "Air Police" are located just below the eagle and has a colored Air Force emblem)

In 1947, the United States Air Force separated from the Army, and the proud tradition of the Security Forces began. At first, the Security Forces were still called the Military Police, and still wore the old Army arm band, or brassard. Soon the Military Police were renamed the Air Police, but they continued to wear the arm band. During this change the brassard was redesigned to show the words Air Police in yellow on a background of Air Force blue. Further editions of the brassard showed the same Air Police in dull gray on a background of dark blue.

Despite the history behind the Military Police brassard, many Air Police of the time felt that it was a poor insignia of authority. The brassard was prone to wrinkle extensively during the course of duty, and often slipped down the arm. As result, Air Police leadership requested a shield to replace the brassard.

The idea of a more permanent shield was met with overwhelming enthusiasm by the Air Police. Some units even began to fashion shields to be worn on the uniform before the official shield was produced. Many of these original shields survive today and can be seen on display in the Security Forces Museum at Lackland Air Force Base, San Antonio, Texas. In many cases it is unknown when or where these 'pre-shields' were produced and worn, but the enthusiasm for the creation of an official shield continued to grow consistently across the career field.

In October 1956, the Air Provost Marshal requested permission to design and field test an official Air Police Shield. By May 1957, permission had been received and the design process had been completed. Units across the Air Force in three major commands began receiving the first official Air Police Shields to field test. Initially, the shield was similar to the current representation, save for the fact that it was silver-plated with blue and white inlays and bore the words 'Air Police.' During field trials, AP's reported that the inlays often chipped off, giving the shield a worn look. Additionally the pins that held the shield to the uniform often broke off. Following a redesign, the inlays were deleted, and the pins were replaced by a clasp much the same as found on civilian police badges. Starting in February 1959, distribution of the new Air Police Shield to units across the Air Force was begun, and completed in 1960. During this transition, AP's continued to wear the original brassard.

The shield underwent further redesign in November 1966 when the Air Force renamed the Air Police. The new shield remained much the same as its predecessor, except that it was no longer silver-plated, but made of a silver-colored base metal and bore the inscription 'Security Police,' which was the new title of the career field.

The Security Police is a symbol of authority and responsibility to each member who wears it. Because of this, the Air Force initially feared that SP's could abuse the power that came with the shield. As a result, shields were issued to Squadron Commanders and were squadron property. Each shield was issued to on duty Security Police at weapons issue and subsequently turned in after each shift of duty.

At this time, the metal shield was worn on both the dress uniform, and the fatigues. By 1975, Security Police leadership realized that a new solution was needed. When worn on the fatigue uniform, the shield was prone to damage from abuse sustained during the performance of duty. As result, Air Force leadership created and authorized for wear, a cloth shield to be worn on the fatigue uniform. The metal shield was still worn of the dress uniform. Because a cloth shield would be sewn on to the uniform, and not be removable, the Air Force was forced to rescind its policy requiring the turn in of shields at the end of duty. At this time, Security Police Shields became personal property and were worn both on and off duty, on all uniforms.

Originally, the cloth shield was sewn of silver and blue thread on a fatigue background. In 1979, a subdued cloth shield replaced the original, and has followed on to the battle dress uniform, and the new airman battle uniform.
