= United States Air Force Fire Protection =

Military of United States

United States Air Force Fire Protection
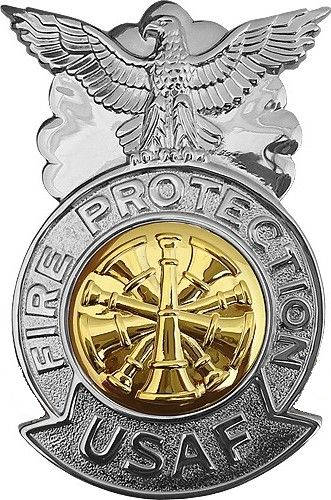
- United States Air Force Fire Protection Badge with Fire Chief Scramble
- Active: 1937 to Present
- Country: United States
- Branch: United States Air Force
- Type: Firefighting
- Role: Fire Department
- Size: 9200
- Nickname: Fire Dawgs
- Mottos: The Desire to Serve, the ability to Perform, and the Courage to Act
- Colors: Red; Gold; Dark Blue; White

The United States Air Force Fire Protection career specialty is the military's premiere specialty in fire protection. Much like their civilian counterparts, these military firefighters protect people, property, and the environment from fires and disasters. They provide firefighting, specialized rescue, HazMat responses, as well as provide fire prevention and response to weapons of mass destruction. Though every branch has its own fire protection career specialties they all must graduate from the Air Force's 13.5 week fire academy (or civilian equivalent) in San Angelo, Texas before being awarded their Firefighter certification.

== History ==
Prior to the National Security Act of 1947 and the subsequent splitting of the Air Corps from the US Army, fire protection in the Armed Forces finds its roots in the armies of the Civil War.

Federal firefighting began when Secretary of War Edwin M. Stanton issued an executive order to Mayor George Opdyke of New York in 1862 for fire protection assistance for the Federal Army. Mayor Opdyke selected Assistant Chief Engineer John Baulch of Eagle Engine Company No. 13, along with Mohawk Engine No. 16 and Peterson Engine No. 31 to provide service to the Federal Army, and they were shipped to Fortress Monroe. John Baulch was appointed Chief Engineer of the Fire Department of the Southern Division of the Federal Army.

During World War I, the United States Army, under the Quartermaster Corps, provided two types of firefighting companies: Fire Truck and Hose Companies. Fire Marshalls of this era held the rank of 1st Lieutenant or Captain. Station Captains were typically manned by a Sergeant First Class. Just three days prior to the December 7, 1941 attacks on Pearl Harbor, the Army transferred the firefighting function from the Quartermaster Corps to the Corps of Engineers and were dubbed Engineer Firefighting Platoons (EFFPs). Engineer Aviation Firefighting Platoons (EAFFPs) were established to provide fire protection for the Army Air Forces. This was the beginning of the USAF Fire Protection field.

The Air Force opened its first firefighting school at Lowry Air Force Base, which moved to Greenville AFB, MS, and, in 1964 to Chanute Air Force Base in Illinois. In 1992, the school was moved finally to Goodfellow AFB in San Angelo, Texas and was named the Louis F. Garland Department of Defense Fire Academy, where it still trains firefighters from every branch of the Armed Forces.

In the early days of the Air Force fire service, the Fire Chief was a civilian position only. The Air Force struggled to maintain adequate numbers of firefighters because the airmen knew they would never be able to become fire chief as a member of the Armed Services.

== Organization ==
The top firefighter position in the Air Force, "The Air Force Fire Chief," is the most senior fire chief position and runs the Department of the Air Force Fire & Emergency Services Branch (HAF/A4CXF) within the Readiness Division (HAF/A4CX), Director of Civil Engineers (HAF/A4C). The CXF is one of six Branches in the Readiness Division (CX) and establishes policy and guidance for Air and Space Force Fire & Services.

OPM Position Title	DoD Certification Requirements	Typical Ranks Associated
Firefighter	Firefighter I & II HazMat Awareness and Operations BLS/EMR Airport Firefighter HazMat Technician (in some departments)	Airman Basic Airman Airman First Class Senior Airman
Driver/Operator	Driver/Operator Pumper Driver/Operator ARFF Driver/Operator Mobile Water Supply All requirements met for Firefighter	
Crew Chief	Fire Officer I Fire Instructor I Fire Inspector I Hazardous Materials Technician All requirements met for Driver/Operator	Senior Airman Staff Sergeant Technical Sergeant
Station Captain	Fire Officer II HazMat Incident Commander All requirements met for Crew Chief	Technical Sergeant
Assistant Chief: Operations; Prevention; Training	Fire Officer III Fire Instructor II Fire Inspector II ICS 300/400	Master Sergeant Senior Master Sergeant
Fire Chief and Deputy Fire Chief	Fire Officer IV	Senior Master Sergeant Chief Master Sergeant

Outside of the basic positions listed above, there are additional titles that exist within the fire service:

- Fire Inspector
- Crew Chief
- Logistics Officer
- District and Division Chief
- Battalion Chief
- Firefighter EMT/Paramedic
- Emergency Communications Center Operator
- Emergency Communications Center Manager

== Traditions ==
Though the civilian fire service is steeped in tradition, the military fire service stymies the amount of distinguishing traditions that their fire companies may establish.

Helmet colors depicting rank is a tradition in the fire service among both civilian and military.

- White - Chief
- Red - Crew Chief/Captain
- Black/Yellow - Firefighter

In some departments, the yellow helmet is used to indicate a probationary firefighter. In other departments, the ranks of "probie" through Captain wear the same color helmet and the rank is depicted by the color of the shield.

Dog - The use of a dog (most notably, the Dalmatian) as a mascot is one of the most distinguishing traditions of fire services. In the military, the fire service is typically portrayed as a Bulldog or Dalmatian. At the fire academy, members of the 312th Training Squadron are referred to as "Fire Dawgs" and are personified by a Bulldog in a fire helmet.

Family - Because firefighters often spend half of their lives with each other it is only natural that lasting relationships develop and a family atmosphere evolves. As a result, the Air Force fire department tends to view it as a close-knit group, separate from the "Regular Air Force."

== Training ==
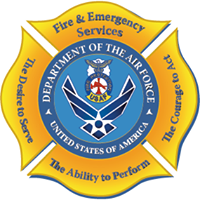
Louis F. Garland DoD Fire Academy logo

The Louis F. Garland Fire Academy. The 17th Training Wing has as its primary mission "To train world-class firefighters."

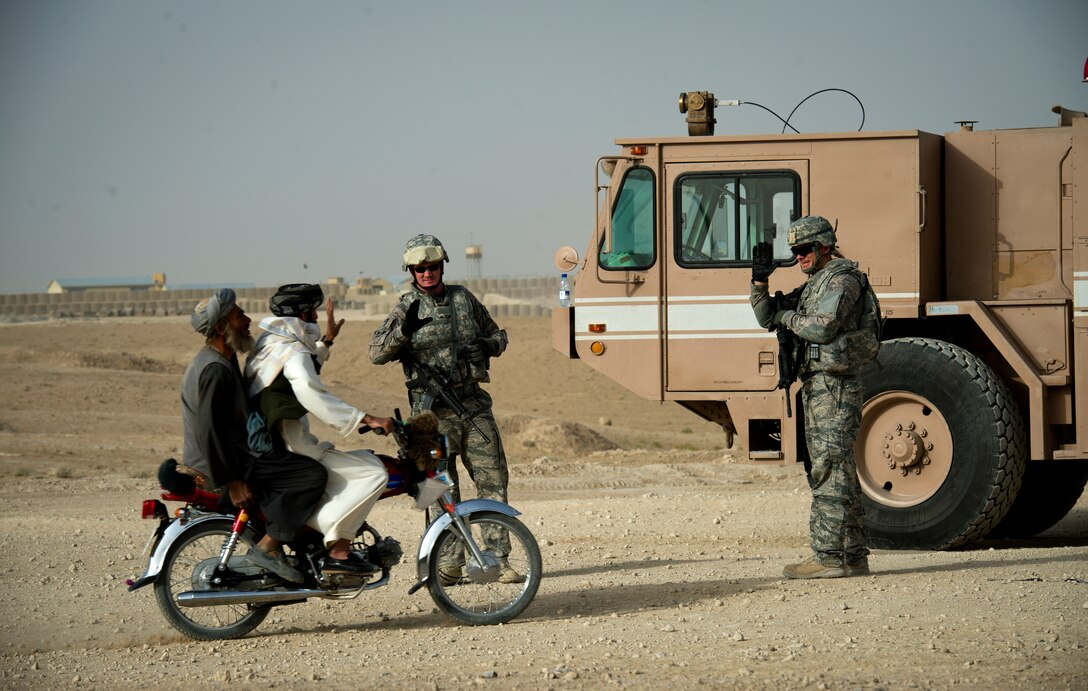
Two USAF Firefighters stand guard by the P-19 fire truck near FOB Apache, Afghanistan, 12 Aug 2011

The fire academy's 68-day course length does not include weekends and is actually 13.5 weeks in length. School is broken up into six blocks of instruction, varying in length, that include:

- First Responder/EMS
- Fire Protection Fundamentals/Fire Behavior
- Structural Firefighting/Vehicle Extrication
- Structural Fire Ground Operations
- Hazardous Materials Awareness and Operations
- Airport Firefighting

Initially, the fire training was designed to weed out those who could not perform. However, in the last 10 years the 80% test requirement to pass was lowered to 70%, and the 8-minute timed 'Firefighter's PT' passing requirement was eliminated in order to lower the wash-out rate.

== Special Operations ==
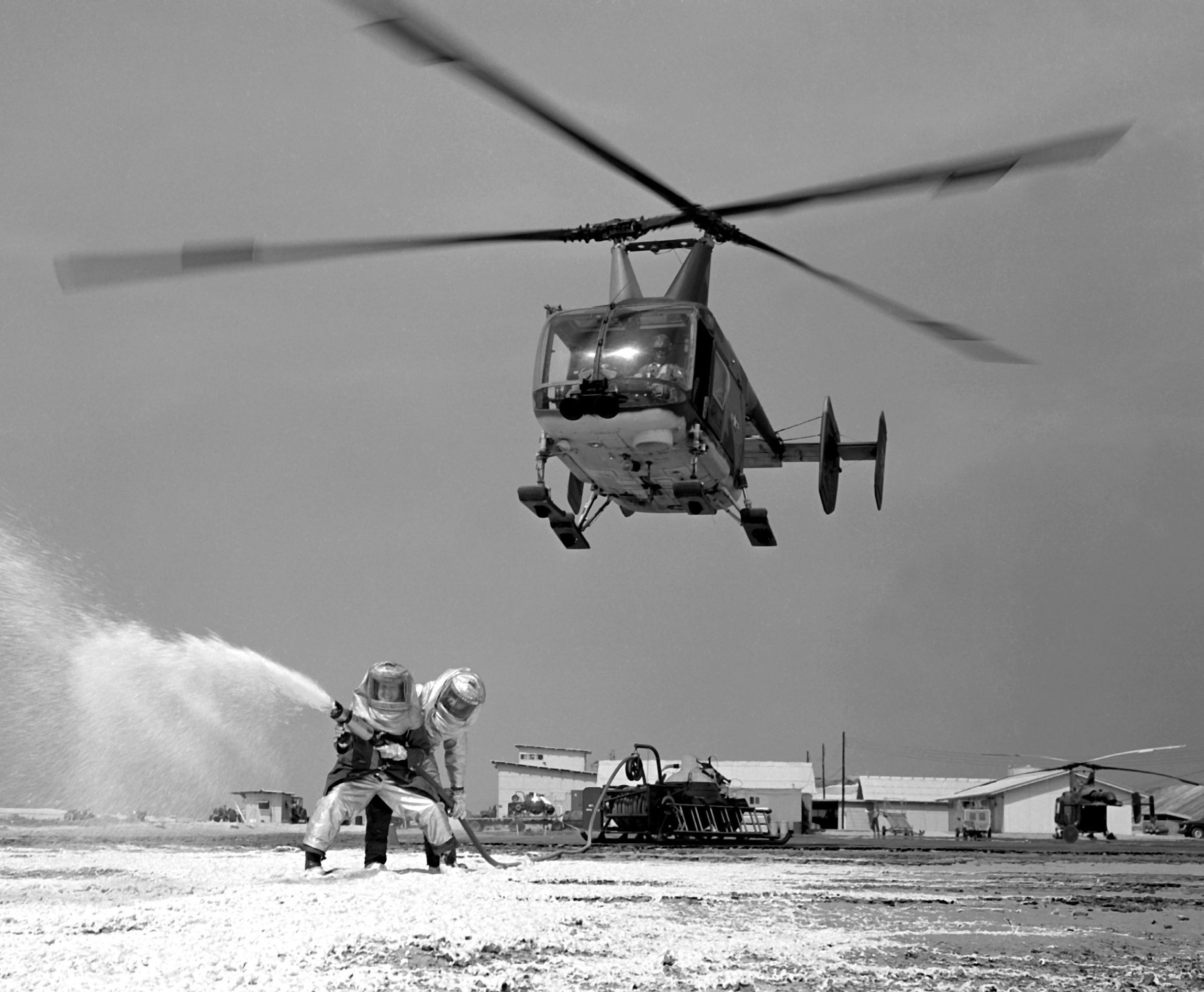
U.S. Air Force fire protection specialists fight a fire as an HH-43B Huskie helicopter hovers overhead to create a continuous downward air current, assisting the crew members. The crew is assigned to Detachment 8, 38th Aerospace Rescue and Recovery Squadron, Cam Ranh Bay Air Base, Vietnam.

Fire Department Special Operations include any category of operation that exists outside the normal mission of firefighting. The "bread and butter" operations of a fire department typically include fire suppression, ventilation, ladder operations, fire ground searches, etc.

These fall under the category 'standard operations.' Special Operations are "those emergency incidents to which the fire department responds that require specific and advanced training and specialized tools and equipment," and include specialized rescue operations such as High Angle, Trench, Confined Space, and Swift Water Rescue, Marine firefighting, Hazardous Material Response, Urban Search and Rescue (USAR), military units also have Combat Search and Rescue (CSAR), and in some instances, Aircraft Rescue and Firefighting (ARFF). These special operations required additional training and certification to perform. Often, these tasks are performed by heavy rescue or squad units.

In the 1960s Airborne Firefighting training was conducted at Stead AFB, NV, later moving to Sheppard AFB, TX for firefighting assignments with Aerospace Rescue and Recovery Squadrons.

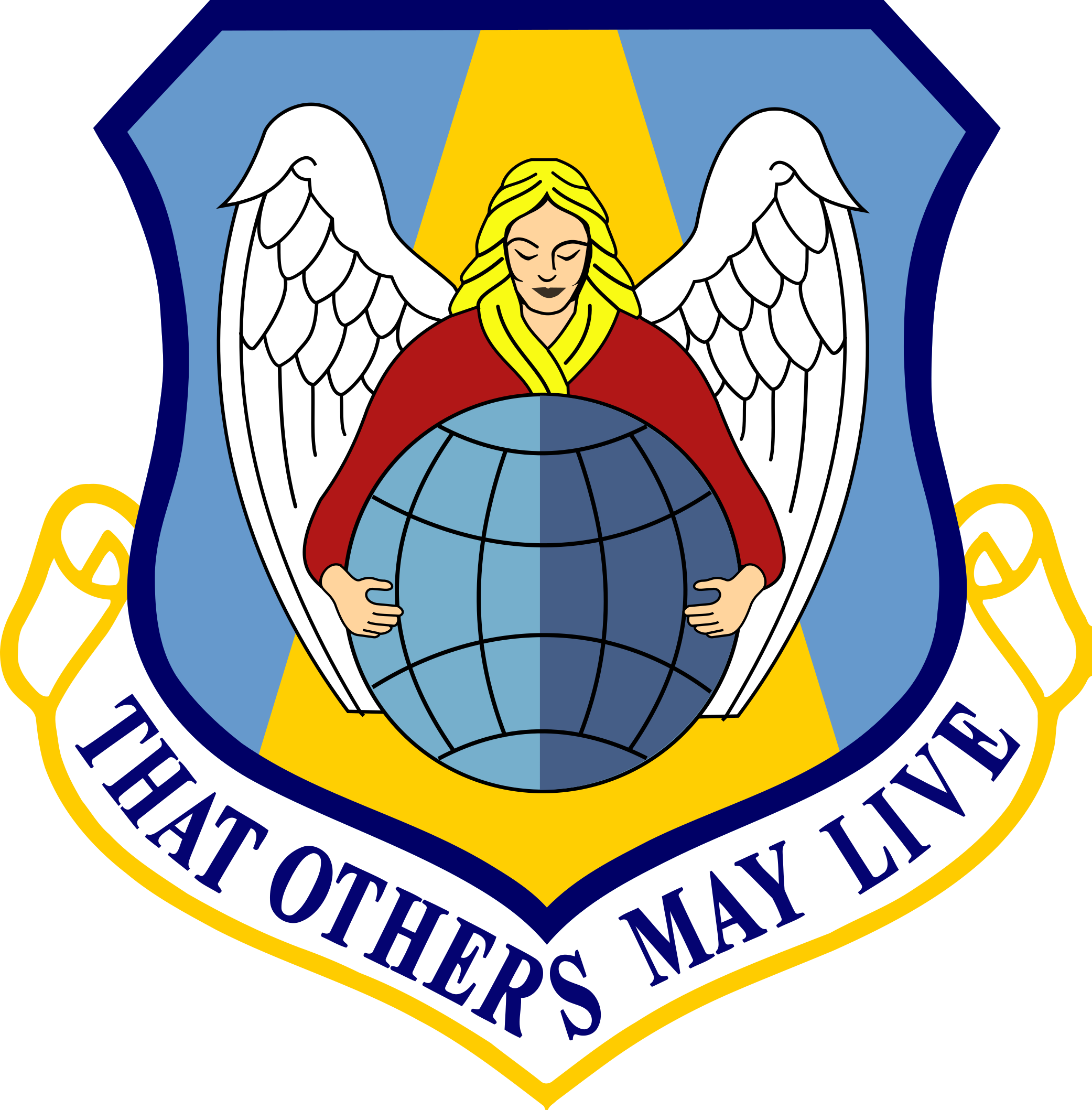
Aerospace Rescue and Recovery Service emblem, which was later adopted by USAF PJs as the official Pararescue logo, along with the 38th ARRS' Motto - "That others may live."

=== Airborne Rescuemen ===
Beginning in 1964 in Da Nang and Bien Hoa Air Bases in Vietnam, the USAF Air Rescue Service began using Kaman HH-43 Huskies for local base recovery (LBR) and aircrew recovery (ACR) missions. Assigned to these "Pedro" flights, as they became known by their callsigns, were typically a tailored combination of Pilot, Copilot, Flight Engineer/Crew Chief, Aeromedical Technician, Airborne Rescuemen/Firefighters, a Pararescue Jumper (PJ) and a Flight Mechanic/Engineer. These flights are currently crewed by USAF Pararescuemen today. Firefighters assigned to these units were called Airborne Rescuemen (ABR). All Pedro units had (ABR) Airborne Rescuemen/Firefighters assigned.

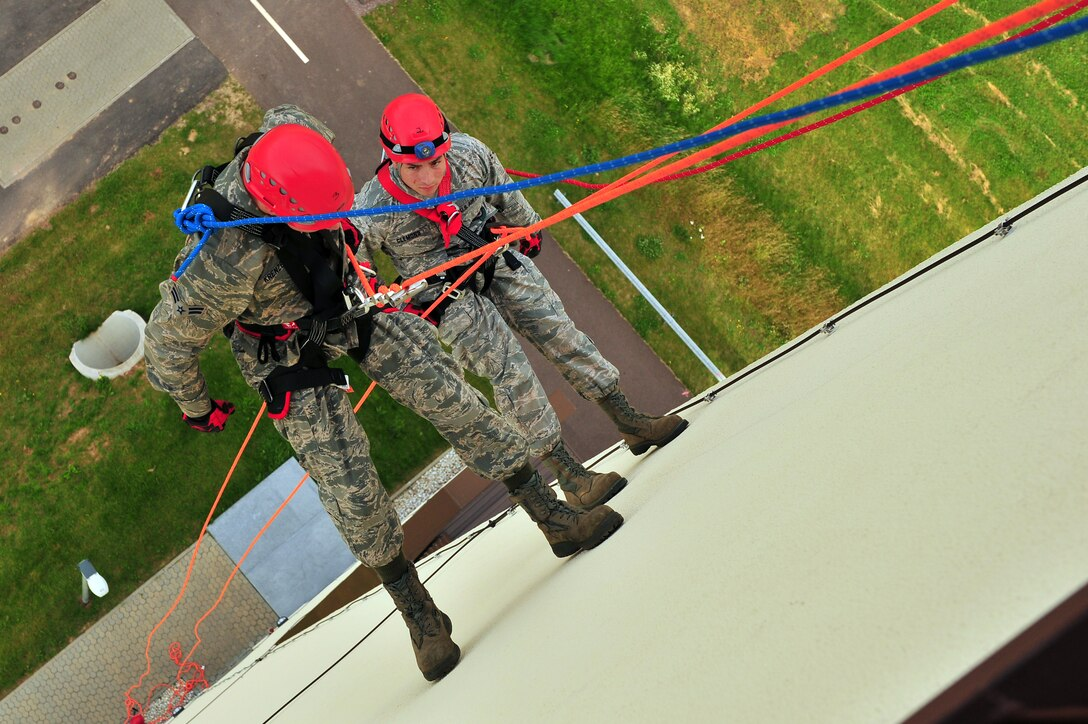
Firefighters from the 52nd Civil Engineer Squadron train in high-angle rescue techniques, rappel from the tower.

During the Vietnam War HH-43 aircrews saved more lives in combat than crews flying any other USAF helicopter. From 1966 to 1970, they performed a total of 888 combat saves—343 aircrew rescues and 545 non-aircrew rescues. It was an HH-43 that carried Airman 1st Class William H. Pitsenbarger on his Medal of Honor mission on April 11, 1966.

==== Pedro 44 ====
October 10, 1968, Pedro 44, Detachment 1 of the 38th ARRS, was responding to a downed B-57 near Phan Rang AB, RVN when a mechanical failure with the HH43 Huskie caused the aircraft to crash to the ground. The crew, pilot Maj. Donald Brooks, co-pilot Capt. Von Liebernecht, firefighters TSgt Emmet Orr and SSgt Milard Bledsoe, and Medical Technician TSgt Angel Luna all died in the crash.

== Recent events ==
=== Airborne RED HORSE ===
Based on the suggestion of then-Secretary of Defense Robert McNamara, who asked the Air Force to develop its own combat construction teams, the Air Force created RED HORSE Squadrons. In 2002, Gen. John Jumper further developed the RED HORSE mission by establishing three new Airborne RED HORSE units. Airborne RED HORSE teams are significantly different than the rest of traditional RED HORSE combat engineer squadrons in that members are airborne qualified and use much lighter specialized equipment. ARH team members also attend a 13-day Army Air Assault course to learn how to sling-load their equipment and rappel from helicopters. ARH teams take 21 traditional RED HORSE members and augment them with six firefighters, six explosive ordnance disposal technicians, two chemical and biological readiness experts, and security forces personnel, as needed.

=== Combat-Ready ===
Two Airmen with the 341st Civil Engineer Squadron firefighters graduate along with Security Forces peers from a Tactical Response Force Orientation Course Oct. 25, 2019, at Malmstrom Air Force Base, Mont. "During the course they go through close-quarters combat, rappelling, helicopter operations, small-unit-tactics, individual movement tactics, hostage situations and rescue, recapture-recovery operations, barricaded suspects and active shooter response," said SSgt Phillip Hopkins. To wrap up the course, members conducted 72-hour sleep deprivation operations. The new initiative essentially utilizes Air Force Firefighter/EMTs as combat medics

== Notable USAF Firefighters ==
Jack Nicholson, In 1957, Nicholson joined the California Air National Guard and performed weekend drills and two-week annual training as a firefighter assigned to the unit based at the Van Nuys Airport.

SSgt Ray Rangel, assigned the 732nd Expeditionary Civil Engineering Squadron Fire Department, died during a rescue response when an Army Humvee from the 5th Squadron, 7th Cavalry, 3d Infantry Division overturned in a canal during a combat patrol near Balad AB, Iraq 13 February 2005.

Robert A. McAllister. Over the course of his 28-year Air Force career, he worked every position in the fire station including firefighter, crew chief, rescueman, rescue specialist, station chief, assistant chief, fire inspector, training chief, deputy chief and fire chief. He even worked directly with Pararescue Jumpers as a part of the elite Airborne Rescue Specialist/Firefighter. During his time in Vietnam, he earned many prestigious medals, decorations and awards including 33 Air Medals for over 1,155 combat missions, the Silver Star for his participation in the recovery of a downed B-52H tail gunner, two Bronze Stars, six Meritorious Service Medals, six Air Force Commendation Medals and the Vietnamese Medal of Honor for training Vietnamese firefighters. McAllister was directly responsible for saving 17 Airmen and recovering several remains of those killed in action. He retired at the rank of Senior Master Sergeant and continued working for the Air Force in the civilian sector.

Airman First Class Robert Doss was a firefighter and rescueman with Pacific Air Rescue Center (PARC) Detachment 4. On 27 April 1965, at 1605 hours, an A-1 Skyraider of the RVNAF 23rd Tactical Wing, fully fueled and laden with Mk82 500-pound bombs, crashed during take-off. A1C Doss and his crew responded immediately. As the rescue crew approached the burning aircraft to rescue the pilot, the ordinance on the aircraft exploded. A1C Doss was struck in the chest by a fragment from the exploding aircraft and was killed.
