= U.S. Defense Department firefighters =

US military fire department

The U.S. Department of Defense employs civilians who are stationed at military bases to work as firefighters. These personnel have their own uniforms and equipment, but are not considered to be members of a military unit. They are responsible for firefighting, but they may also receive aid from military units. Each U.S. Defense Department firefighter has his or her own uniform, usually a dark blue suit with a badge and a shoulder patch indicating his or her status. They wear dark blue pants per United States Army regulation, but shirts can be dark blue, light blue, or white depending on the person's rank. This only applies to this organization, and not the Department of Defense.

Various certifications exist for personnel in this organization. One major certification is referred to as "Department of Defense(DoD) Fire & Emergency Services Training." Firefighters must be Department of Defense Certified as Firefighter I, Firefighter II, HazMat Awareness and HazMat Operations, and Airport Firefighter. Additionally, the applicant must obtain and maintain a current Basic Life Support for the Healthcare Provider (CPR and AED) card.

== See also ==
- Firefighting
