= Potez-CAMS 141 =

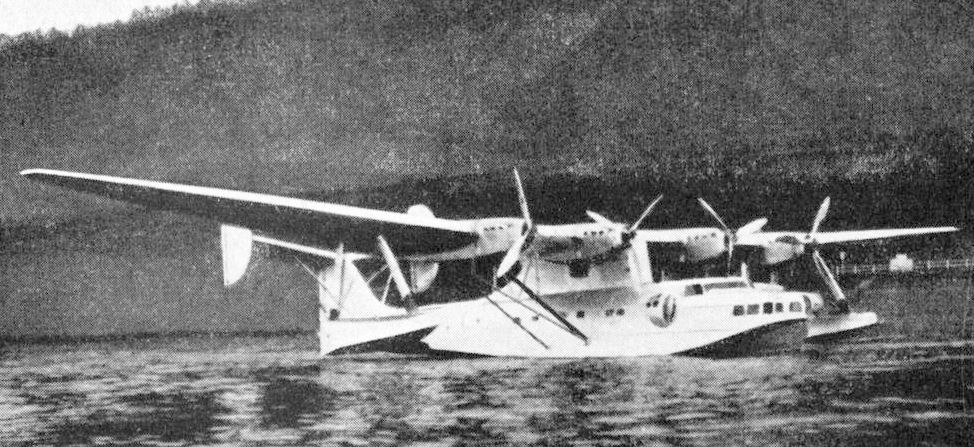

General information
- Type: Flying Boat
- Manufacturer: Potez-CAMS
- Primary user: French Navy
- Number built: 1

History
- Introduction date: 1939
- First flight: January 21, 1938
- Retired: 1943

The Potez-CAMS 141 was a French long range reconnaissance flying boat of the late 1930s. Intended to equip the French Navy, only a single prototype was completed before the German invasion of France stopped production. That prototype did, however serve operationally from bases in French North Africa until scrapped in 1943.

== Development and design ==
The Potez-CAMS 141 was designed by Chantiers Aéro-Maritimes de la Seine (or CAMS, which since 1933 had been part of Potez) to meet a 1935 French Navy specification for a long range marine reconnaissance flying boat to replace obsolete aircraft such as the Breguet Bizerte, competing against the Latécoère 611 and Breguet 730. The prototype first flew on 21 January 1938 at Caudebec-en-Caux, starting official trials in August 1938.

It was a four engined monoplane, powered by Hispano-Suiza 12Y engines, with a braced, high aspect ratio wing mounted above the fuselage and a twin tail. It was armed with a dorsal turret carrying two 7.5 mm Darne machine guns, with a further two machine guns in lateral "cheek" barbettes and two in waist positions. After evaluation, a production order for four aircraft was placed, with a further 15 being ordered before the start of the Second World War.

== Operational history ==
The prototype, named Antarès, entered service with Escadrille E8 of the French Navy in September 1939, flying its first patrol mission over the Atlantic on 20 September 1939. Additional large orders for Potez-CAMS 141s were placed shortly after the start of the war, with delivery expected from June 1940, but these orders were cut back owing to changing priorities and the realisation that the loss rate of long range flying boats was very low.

No production aircraft had been completed by the time of the Armistice in June 1940, with Antarès being evacuated to Port Lyautey in Morocco. It was operated by the Vichy French Navy, serving with Escadrille 4E at Dakar, continuing in service until the Allied Invasion of North Africa, when after brief fighting, the French armed forces in North Africa joined with the Free French. Antarès continued in service, carrying out patrols over the Central and South Atlantic. On 2 June 1943, Antarès sank the German submarine U-105 near Dakar. Antarès was retired and scrapped early in 1944.

== Operators ==
France

- French Navy

Vichy France

- Vichy French Air Force

== Specifications (Potez-CAMS 141) ==
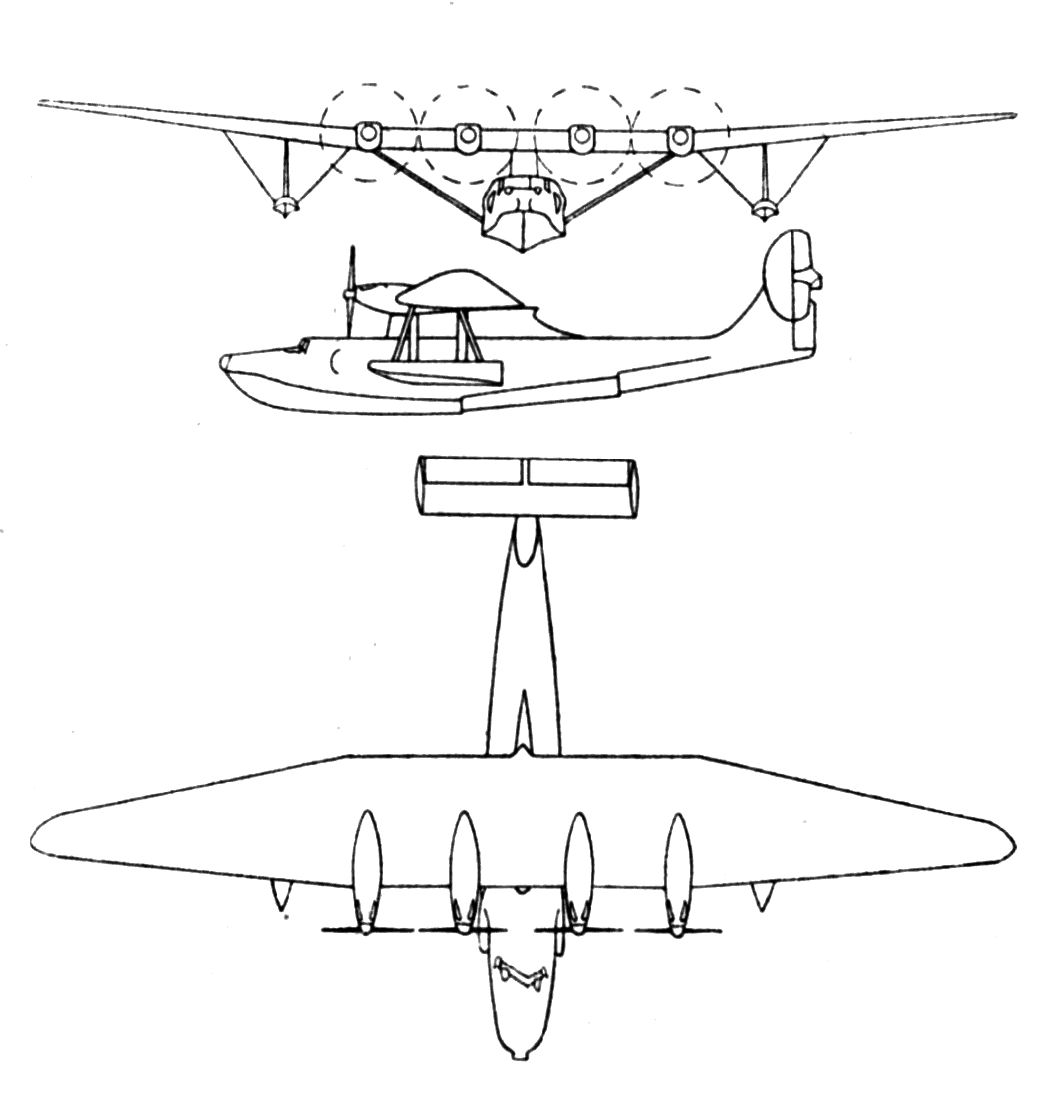
Potez 141 3-view drawing from L'Aerophile March 1938

Data from Warplanes of the Second World War, Volume Five, Flying Boats

General characteristics

- Crew: 9–12
- Length: 24.31 m (79 ft 9 in)
- Wingspan: 41.01 m (134 ft 7 in)
- Height: 7.85 m (25 ft 9 in)
- Wing area: 171.1 m^{2} (1,842 sq ft)
- Empty weight: 15,031 kg (33,138 lb)
- Gross weight: 23,148 kg (51,033 lb)
- Max takeoff weight: 26,055 kg (57,441 lb)
- Powerplant: 2 × Hispano-Suiza 12Y-26 liquid-cooled V-12 piston engines, 640 kW (860 hp) each (handed rotation)
- Powerplant: 2 × Hispano-Suiza 12Y-27 liquid-cooled V-12 piston engines, 640 kW (860 hp) each (handed rotation)

Performance

- Maximum speed: 320 km/h (200 mph, 170 kn)
- Cruise speed: 260 km/h (160 mph, 140 kn)
- Endurance: 30 hours
- Service ceiling: 5,600 m (18,400 ft)
- Wing loading: 135 kg/m^{2} (28 lb/sq ft)
- Power/mass: 0.12 kW/kg (0.073 hp/lb)

Armament

- Two 7.5 mm Darne machine guns in dorsal turret, two machine guns in lateral "cheek" barbettes and two machine guns in waist positions
- up to 1,500 kg (3,300 lb) of bombs.

== See also ==
Aircraft of comparable role, configuration, and era

- Blackburn Sydney
- Breguet 730
- Dornier Do 24
- Kawanishi H6K
- Latécoère 300
- Latécoère 611
- Lioré et Olivier LeO H-47

Related lists

- List of aircraft of the French Air Force during World War II
- List of flying boats and floatplanes

== Bibliography ==
- Bousquet, Gérard (2013). French Flying Boats of WW II. Sandomierz, Poland: Stratus. ISBN 978-83-63678-06-7.
