= Dornier Do 24 =

1937 multi-role flying boat family by Dornier

Do 24
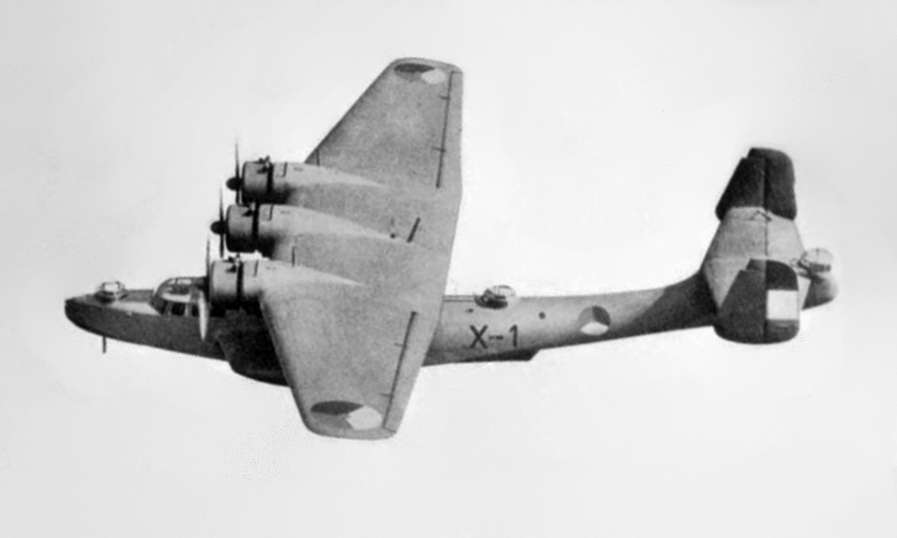
- A Dutch Do 24 flying-boat

General information
- Type: Bomber, reconnaissance and air-sea rescue flying boat
- National origin: Nazi Germany
- Manufacturer: Dornier Flugzeugwerke
- Built by: Aviolanda; SNCAN
- Primary users: Luftwaffe Netherlands Naval Aviation Service
- Number built: 279

History
- Manufactured: 1937–1945
- Introduction date: November 1937
- First flight: 3 July 1937
- Retired: 1967 (Spanish Air Force)

The Dornier Do 24 is a 1930s German three-engine flying boat designed by the Dornier Flugzeugwerke for maritime patrol and search and rescue. A total of 313 were built among several factories from 1937 to 1945.

== Design and development ==
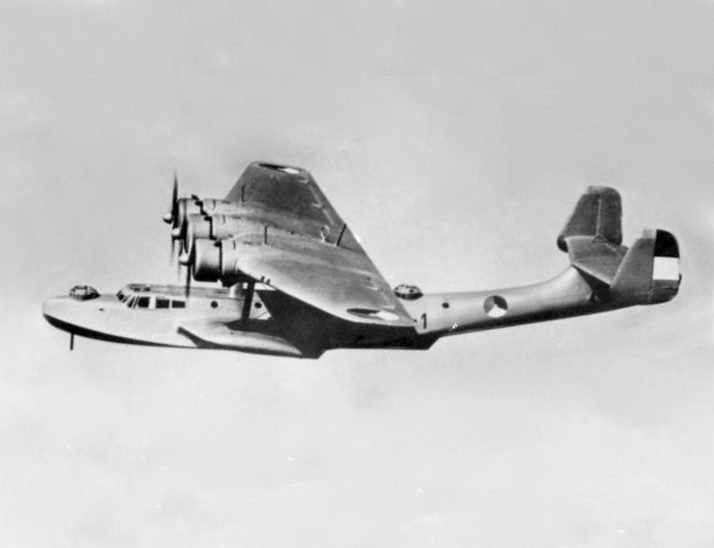
Dornier Do 24 V3 prototype in Dutch markings

The Dornier Do 24 was designed to meet a Reichsluftfahrtministerium (Ministry of Aviation) requirement for a three-engined maritime patrol and search and rescue flying boat, as a more potent successor to the Dornier 18. Although two prototypes V1 and V2 were started for the German navy, this development was quickly overtaken by the Blohm & Voss BV 138 being much more promising. The construction of these prototypes was halted by Dornier, to be completed only after the third prototype V3.

Soon after this pause the Royal Netherlands Navy issued a requirement for a replacement of the Dornier Wals being used by its Naval Aviation Service in the Dutch East Indies, with the Netherlands government signing a contract for six Dornier Do 24s on 3 August 1936. After the third prototype V3 made its first flight on July 3, 1937 and evaluation by the Reichsluftfahrtministerium, it was completed as the first production machine X-1 for the Dutch Navy (see picture).

The Do 24 was an all-metal parasol monoplane with a broad-beamed hull and stabilising sponsons. Twin tails were mounted on the upswept rear of the hull, while three wing-mounted tractor configuration engines powered the aircraft. Fuel was carried in tanks in the sponsons and the wing centre section. Up to 1,200 kg (2,600 lb) of bombs could be carried under the aircraft's wings, while defensive armament consisted of three gun turrets, one each in nose, dorsal and tail positions. In early aircraft the turrets were each fitted with a machine gun but later aircraft carried a 20 mm cannon in the dorsal turret. The Do 24 was one of the few German Luftwaffe aircraft that featured a tail turret.

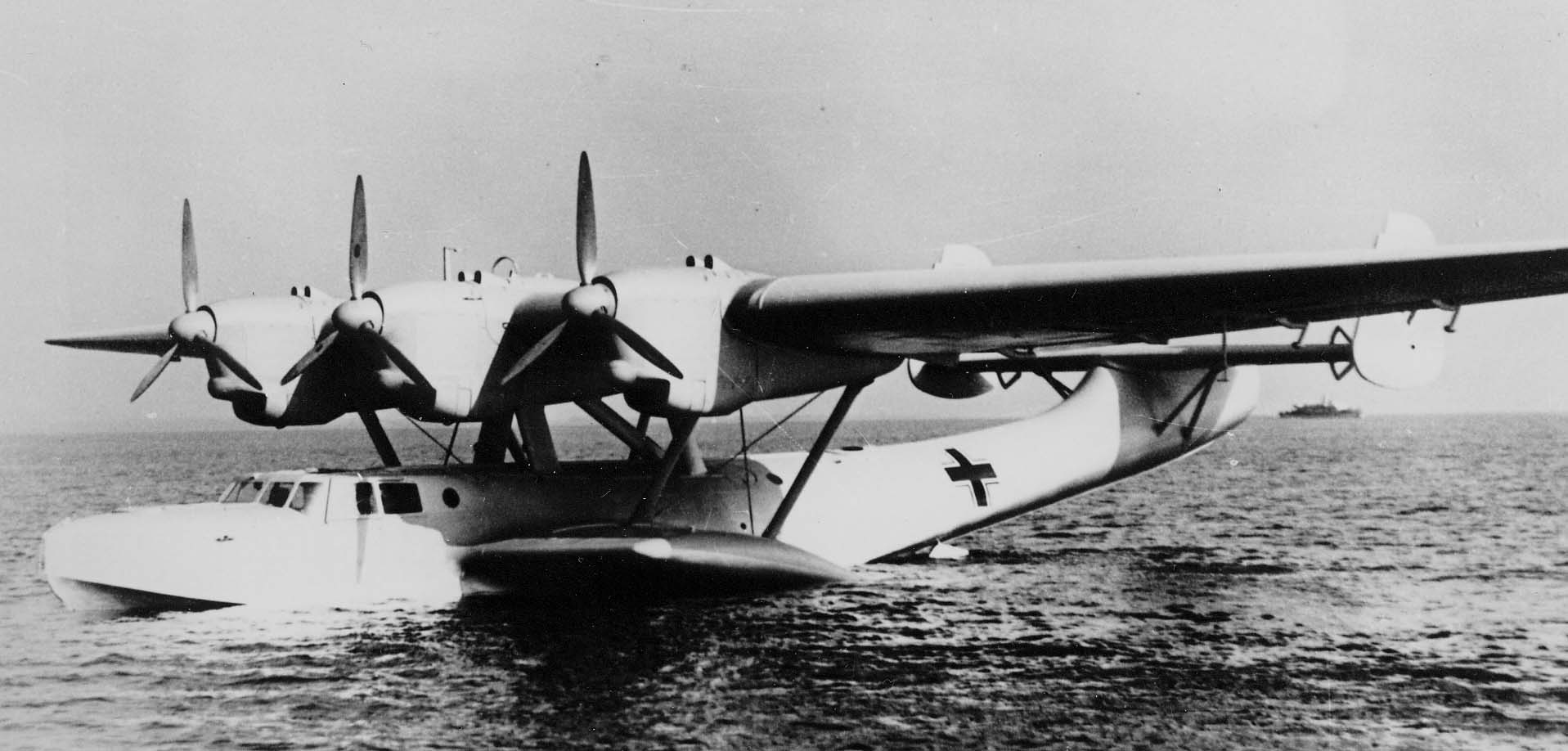
Diesel-powered Luftwaffe Do 24 V1 trials aircraft being used as an air-sea rescue aircraft

Do 24 V3, the first of the Dutch X boats, as they would be called in Dutch service, took off from Lake Constance on 3 July 1937, with the second Dutch boat, Do 24 V4 following soon after. As the Dutch required that their flying boats use the same engines as the Martin 139 bombers in use in the Dutch East Indies, they were fitted with 661 kW (887 hp) Wright R-1820-F52 Cyclone radial engines. Test results were good, with the new flying boat proving capable of operating from extremely rough open seas and the Dutch placed an order for a further 12 Do 24s on 22 July 1937. Do 24 V1, the first of the two aircraft for Germany, powered by three 450 kW (600 hp) Junkers Jumo 205C diesel engines, flew on 10 January 1938 but after evaluation, the two German boats were returned to Dornier for storage.

The Netherlands was enthusiastic and planned to purchase as many as 90. Of these, 30 were to be built by Dornier (with all but the first two prototypes assembled by Dornier's Swiss subsidiary based at Altenrhein). The remaining aircraft were to be built under licence in the Netherlands by Aviolanda at Papendrecht. Of these aircraft, all but one of the German and Swiss built aircraft and the first seven Aviolanda-built aircraft were to be Do 24K-1s, powered by the original R-1820-F52 engines, while the remaining aircraft were to be Do 24K-2s, with more powerful 820 kW (1,100 hp) R-1820-G102 engines and additional fuel.

With the German occupation, production was stopped while the Luftwaffe Küstenfliegergruppen Maritime reconnaissance branch was uninterested in the partially completed aircraft as they had already chosen the Blohm und Voss Bv 138 for the role, the Dutch production line resumed, to provide aircraft for the otherwise poorly equipped Seenotdienst (Sea Emergency Service), which was still operating Heinkel He 59 biplanes. The 13 airframes on the Aviolanda assembly line were completed with Dutch-bought Wright Cyclone engines but later models used the BMW Bramo 323R-2. An additional 159 Do 24s were built in the Netherlands during the occupation, most under the designation Do 24T-1.

Another production line for the Do 24 was established in the CAMS factory at Sartrouville, France, during the German occupation. This line was operated by SNCAN and produced 48 Do 24s during the war and another 40 after the liberation of France, which served with the French Navy until 1952.

== Operational history ==
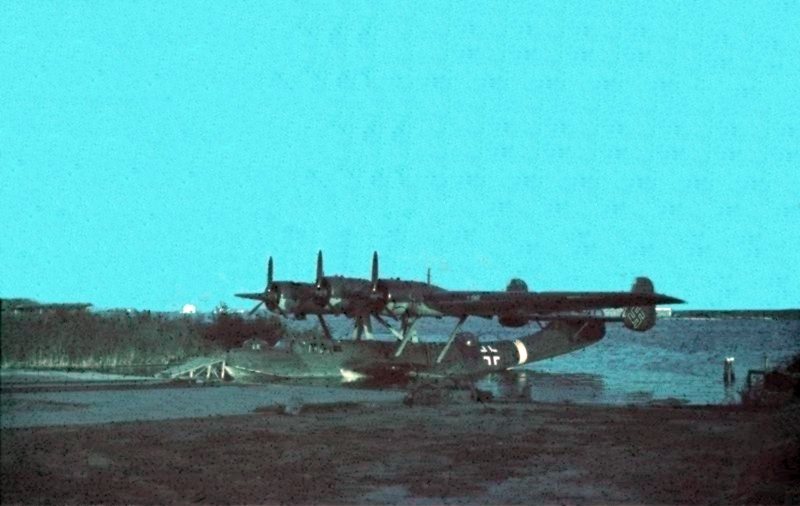
Luftwaffe Do 24 in Romania, 1941

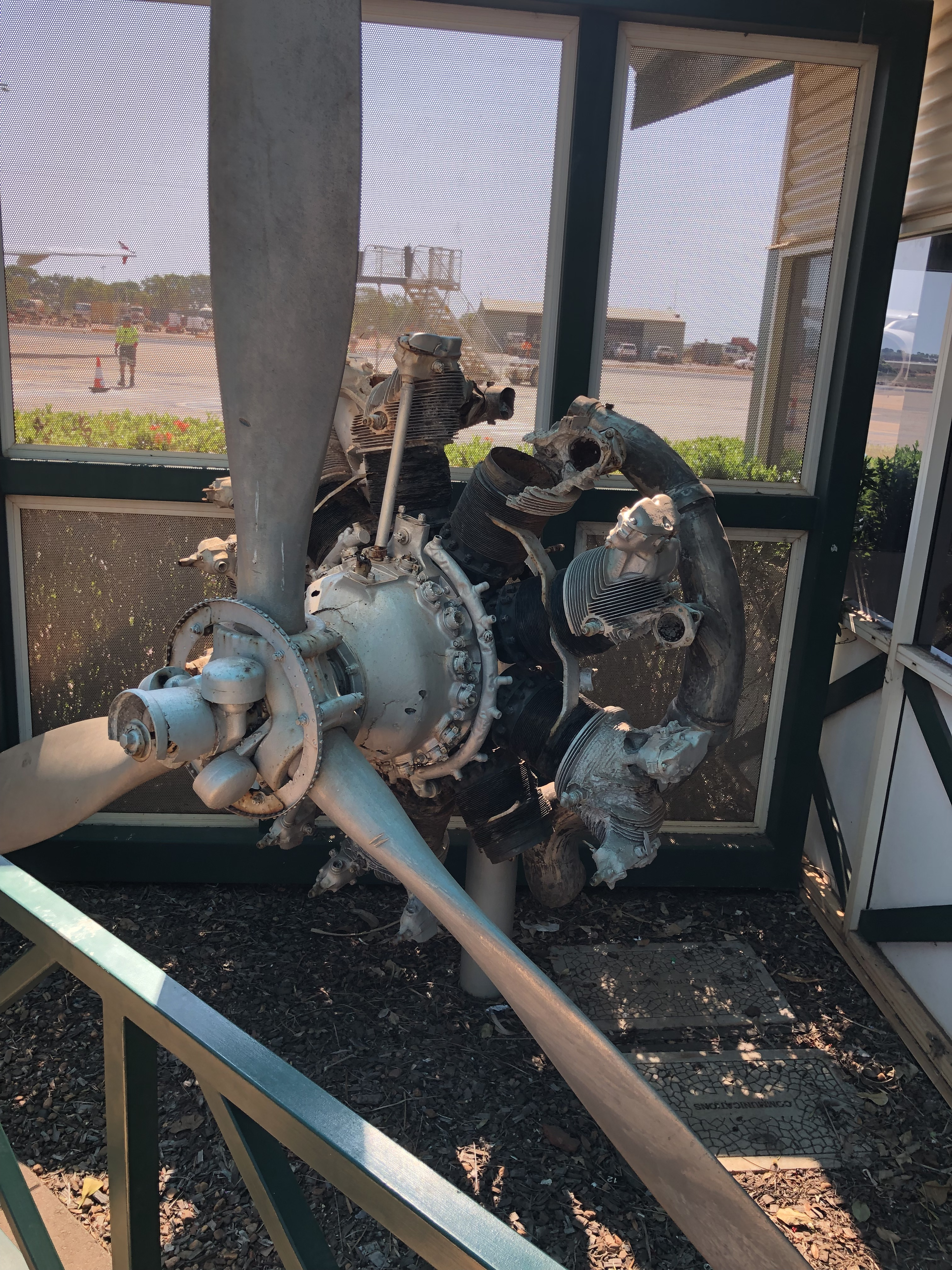

=== Australia ===
Of the six Do-24K aircraft that Australia obtained, five served with No. 41 Squadron RAAF, performing transport, reconnaissance and rescue missions in Australia and New Guinea. Due to the lack of maintenance equipment and spare parts, the aircraft were frequently unserviceable while awaiting repairs. One aircraft was lost to a fire in March 1944, and the remaining aircraft were placed in long term storage by June 1944.

A Do-24k engine is on display at Broome Airport. The plaque states that the flying boat was destroyed by an attack of 9 Japanese Zeros in Roebuck Bay and Broome Airport on 3 March 1942.File:Broome_Airport_Engine_Display_Plaque.jpg

=== Germany ===
The two prototypes were used during the invasion of Norway to transport troops to Narvik.

The aircraft captured and produced in the Netherlands were pressed into service with Seenotstaffeln and deployed in the Arctic, Baltic, North Sea, Bay of Biscay, Mediterranean, and Black Sea. They were also used as transports, notably for keeping contact with the troops left behind on the Aegean Islands and Crete, and for supporting the Kuban bridgehead in early 1943.

=== Netherlands ===
Thirty-seven Dutch- and German-built Do 24s had been sent to the East Indies by the time of the German occupation of the Netherlands in June 1940. Until the outbreak of war, these aircraft would have flown the tri-color roundel. Later, to avoid confusion with British or French roundels, Dutch aircraft flew a black-bordered orange triangle insignia.

A Dutch Dornier Do 24 is credited with sinking the Japanese destroyer Shinonome on 17 December 1941 while the ship was escorting an invasion fleet to Miri in British Borneo. After the Japanese invasion of the Netherlands East Indies, six surviving Do 24s were transferred to the Royal Australian Air Force in February 1942.

=== Spain ===
In 1944, 12 Dutch-built Do 24s were delivered to Spain with the understanding that they would assist downed airmen of both sides. After the war, a few French-built Do 24s also found their way to Spain. Spanish Do 24s were operational at least until 1967, and possibly later. In 1971, one of the last flying Spanish Do 24s was returned to the Dornier facility on Lake Constance for permanent display.

=== Sweden ===
On 31 October 1944, a German Do 24 (CM+RY of Seenotgruppe 81) made a forced landing in neutral Sweden, was impounded and eventually bought, and remained in Swedish service until 1952.

== Variants ==
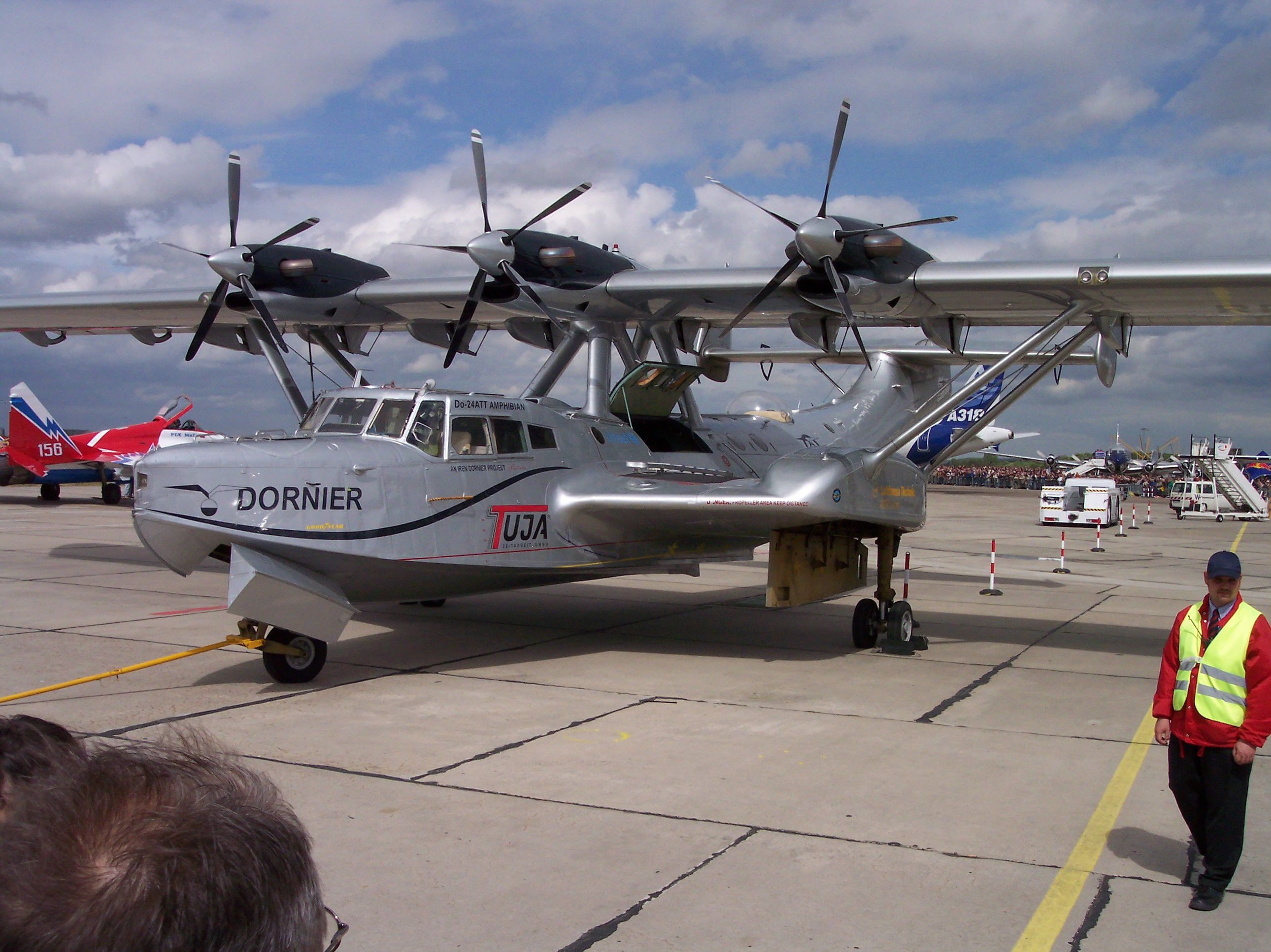
Restored Do 24 ATT re-engined with Pratt & Whitney PT6A-45 turboprop engines

Do 24 V1
Luftwaffe trials aircraft powered by three 450 kW (600 hp) Junkers Jumo 205C liquid-cooled diesel inline engines.
Do 24 V2
Luftwaffe trials aircraft similar to V1
Do 24 V3
Dutch trials aircraft with three 660 kW (880 hp) Wright R-1820-F52 Cyclone air-cooled radial engines. Later became the first Do 24K-1, and was the first Do 24 to fly. Assigned serial X-1.
Do 24 V4
Second K-1 for Dutch trials, Assigned serial X-2.
Do 24K-1
Swiss production by Dornier & Dutch license production aircraft, 36 built. The German civil registration D-AYWI was allocated for these for their ferry flights to Holland from Dornier's production facility in Switzerland.
Do 24K-2
Dutch licence production powered by three 750 kW (1,000 hp) Wright R-1820-G102 Cyclone engines. 1 example completed by Dornier while 13 incomplete airframes were captured by the Germans, and modified for air-sea rescue with additional hatches and a hoist as 24N-1s.
Do 24N-1
13 incomplete Dutch Do 24K-2s being built in Holland completed for the Luftwaffe for air-sea rescue, powered by three 750 kW (1,000 hp) Wright R-1820-G102 engines. As supplies of spares for the R-1820s ran out, surviving aircraft were re-engined with 645 kW (865 hp) BMW 132N radials.
Do 24T-1
French production, 48 built
Do 24T-1
Dutch production for the Luftwaffe powered by three 750 kW (1,000 hp) BMW Bramo 323R-2 Fafnir radial engines, 159 built (including T-2 and T-3).
Do 24T-2
as Do 24T-1 with minor changes to equipment and weapons.
Do 24T-3
as Do 24T-1 with minor changes to equipment and weapons.
Do 24 ATT
Post-war restoration/amphibian conversion of Do 24T-3, with new wing (based on the TNT (Tragflügel Neuer Technologie) wing used in the Dornier 228 airliner), undercarriage and powered by three 1,125 shp (839 kW) Pratt & Whitney Canada PT6A-45 turboprop engines. One converted to serve as testbed for potential new-build amphibian flying boat, first flying on 25 April 1983.
Do 318
One Do 24T modified in 1944 with a boundary-layer control system.

== Operators ==
Australia

- Royal Australian Air Force (six ex-MLD planes; one flew for the Netherlands Forces Intelligence Service while the remaining five served with the No. 41 Maritime Transport Squadron in Queensland)

France

- French Navy (Postwar)

Nazi Germany

- Luftwaffe

Netherlands

- Royal Netherlands Navy
  - Netherlands Naval Aviation Service

Norway

- Royal Norwegian Air Force (Postwar)

Soviet Union

- Polar Aviation

Spain

- Spanish Air Force

Sweden

- Swedish Air Force

== Surviving aircraft ==
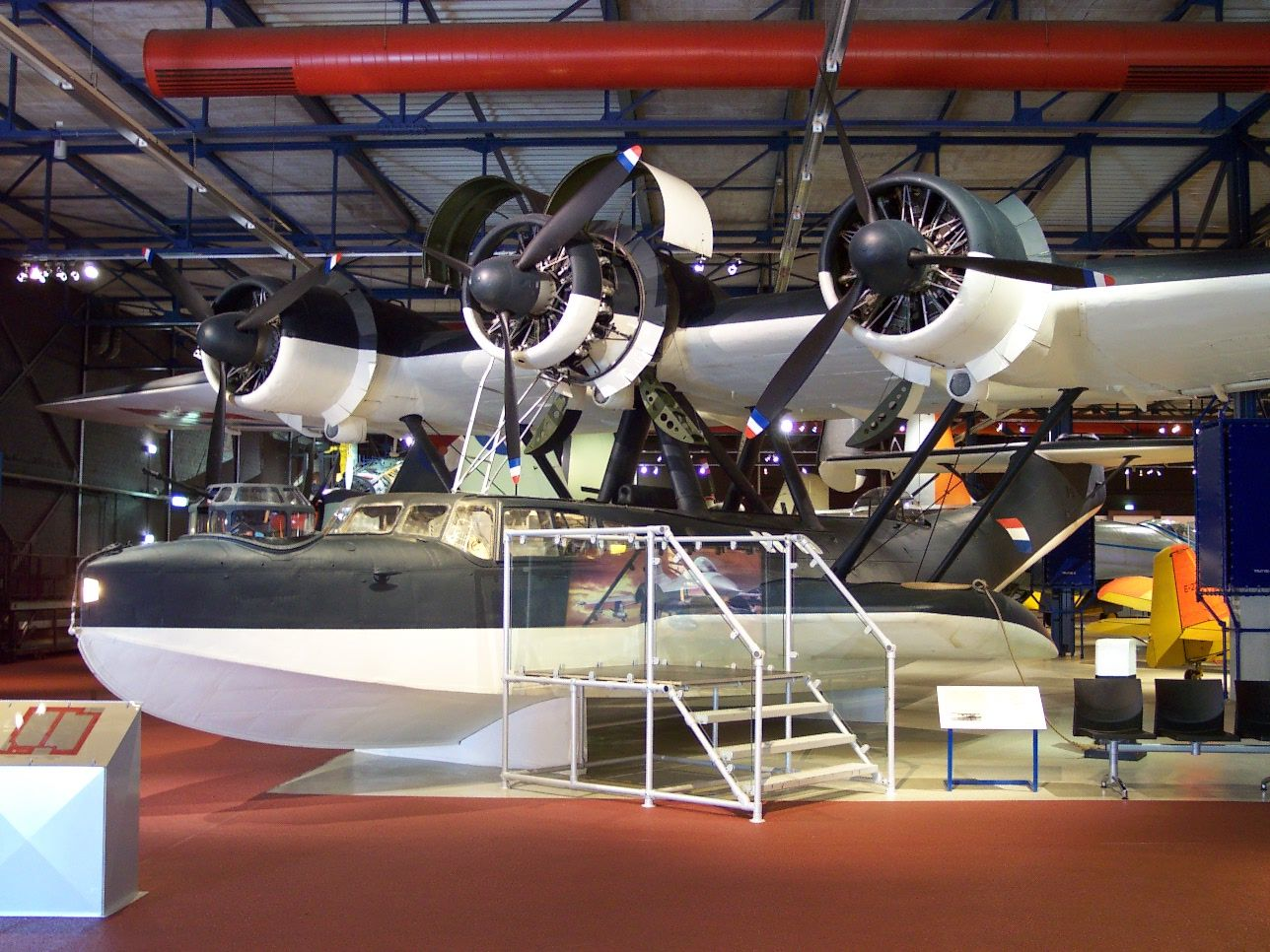
Dornier Do 24 on display at the Nationaal Militair Museum in Soesterberg, Utrecht

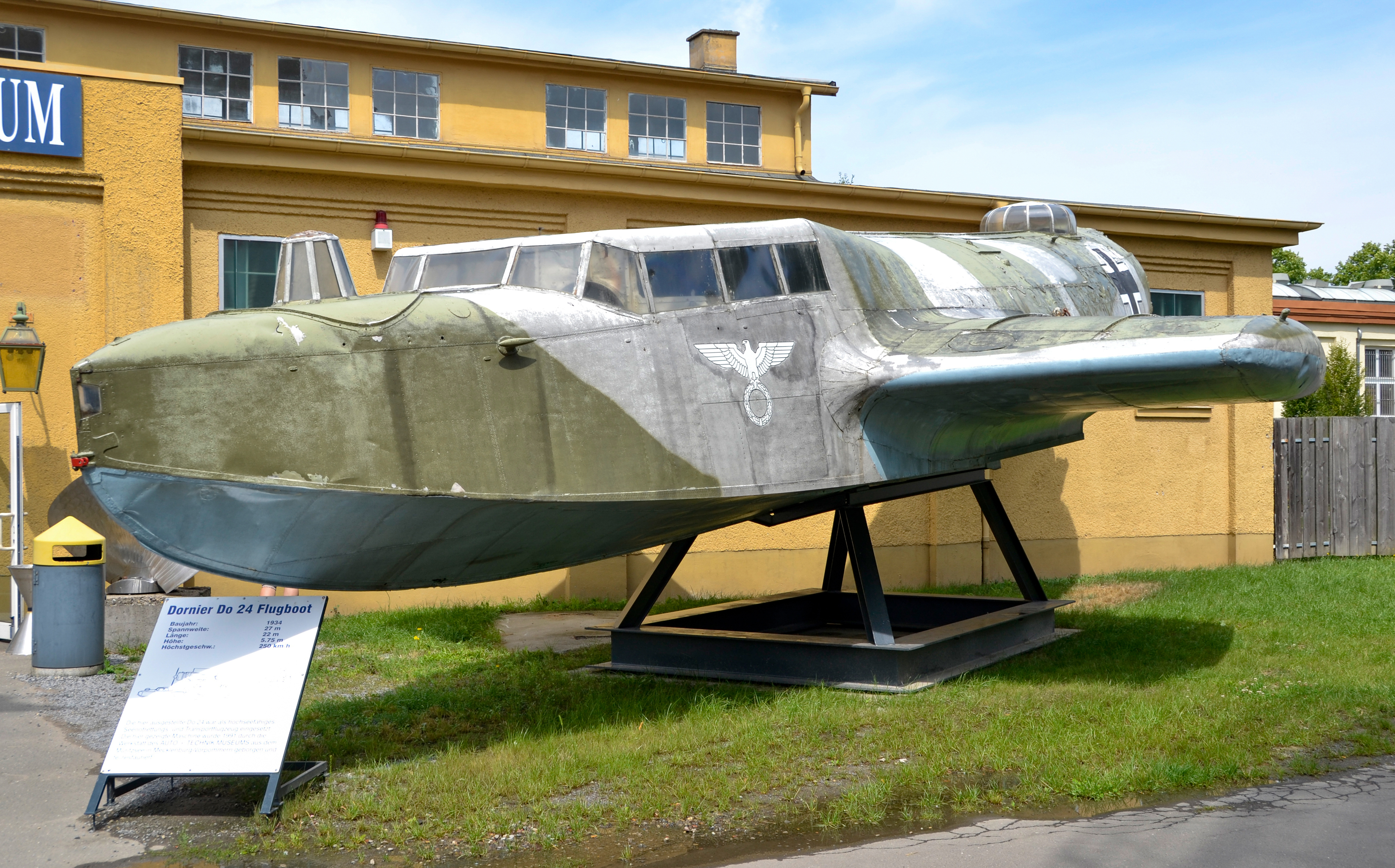
Dornier Do 24T fuselage on display at the Technik Museum Speyer

Australia

- Unknown – Do 24K-1 forward fuselage on static display at the Lake Boga Flying Boat Museum in Lake Boga, Victoria. It was previously used as a private boat in Echuca, Victoria.

France

- 1101 – Do 24T-3 forward fuselage on static display at the Musée de l'Hydraviation in Biscarrosse, Nouvelle-Aquitaine.

Germany

- 5291/5345 – Do 24T-3 on static display at the Deutsches Museum Flugwerft Schleissheim in Oberschleißheim, Bavaria. It was previously on display at the Dornier-Fairchild factory in Oberpfaffenhofen. This aircraft has the fuselage of Aviolanda-built WNr. 5291, mated with the original wing of the Do 24 that became the Do 24ATT:
- Unknown – Do 24T fuselage on display at the Technik Museum Speyer in Speyer, Rhineland-Palatinate.
- 5345 – Do 24 ATT, an extensively modified ex-Spanish Do 24 T-3 fitted with a Dornier 228 type Advanced Technology Wing, re-engined with three PT6A-45B turboprops, and fitted with retractable undercarriage, converting it from a pure flying boat, into an amphibian. In February 2004, it began an around the world flight on behalf of UNICEF to raise money for children in the Philippines, piloted by Iren Dornier, Claudius Dornier's grandson.

Netherlands

- 3387 – Do 24T-3 on static display at the Nationaal Militair Museum in Soesterberg, Utrecht. It is painted in the livery of the Marine Luchtvaartdienst.

Spain

- 2134 – Do 24T-3 on static display at the Museo del Aire in Cuatro Vientos, Madrid.

== Specifications (Do 24T-1) ==
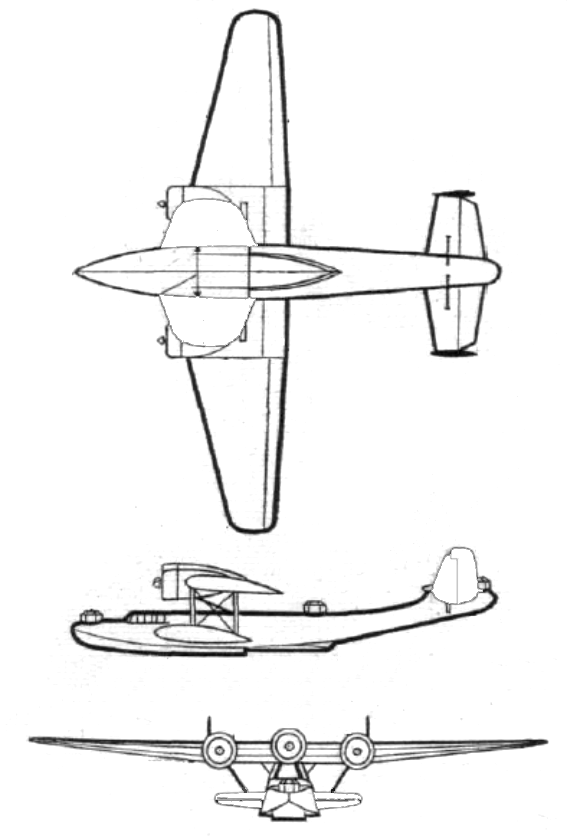

Data from Aircraft of the Third Reich Volume one, German Aircraft of the Second World War, The Cosmopolitan Dornier...Last of the Sponson 'Boats

General characteristics

- Crew: 4 or 6
- Length: 22.05 m (72 ft 4 in)
- Wingspan: 27 m (88 ft 7 in)
- Height: 5.75 m (18 ft 10 in)
- Wing area: 108 m^{2} (1,160 sq ft)
- Empty weight: 9,400 kg (20,723 lb)
- Gross weight: 13,700 kg (30,203 lb)
- Max takeoff weight: 18,400 kg (40,565 lb)
- Fuel capacity: 5,300 L (1,400 US gal; 1,200 imp gal) in two 1,000 L (260 US gal; 220 imp gal) wing tanks and twelve small tanks in the sponsons
- Powerplant: 3 × Bramo 323R-2 Fafnir 9-cylinder air-cooled radial piston engine, 704 kW (944 hp) each
- Propellers: 3-bladed VDM variable-pitch metal propellers

Performance

- Maximum speed: 330 km/h (210 mph, 180 kn) at 2,600 m (8,500 ft)

290 km/h (180 mph; 160 kn) at sea level

- Cruise speed: 295 km/h (183 mph, 159 kn) at 2,600 m (8,500 ft) (maximum continuous)
- Range: 2,900 km (1,800 mi, 1,600 nmi)
- Ferry range: 4,700 km (2,900 mi, 2,500 nmi)
- Service ceiling: 7,500 m (24,600 ft)
- Time to altitude: 2,000 m (6,600 ft) in 6 minutes

4,000 m (13,000 ft) in 13 minutes 12 seconds

Armament

- Guns:
  - 1 × 20 mm (0.787 in) Hispano HS.404 or MG151 autocannon in dorsal turret
  - 1 × 7.92 mm (0.312 in) MG 15 machine gun in nose turret
  - 1 × 7.92 mm (0.312 in) MG 15 machine gun in tail gun position
- Bombs: 1,200 kg (2,600 lb), under the wings

== See also ==
Aircraft of comparable role, configuration, and era

- Blackburn Sydney
- Blériot 5190
- CANT Z.508
- Latécoère 582
- Macchi M.C.100
- Tupolev MTB-1

Related lists

- List of aircraft of World War II
- List of interwar military aircraft
- List of military aircraft of Germany
- List of flying boats and floatplanes
- List of World War II military aircraft of Germany
