= Bréguet 730 =

French aircraft

Br.730/Br.731
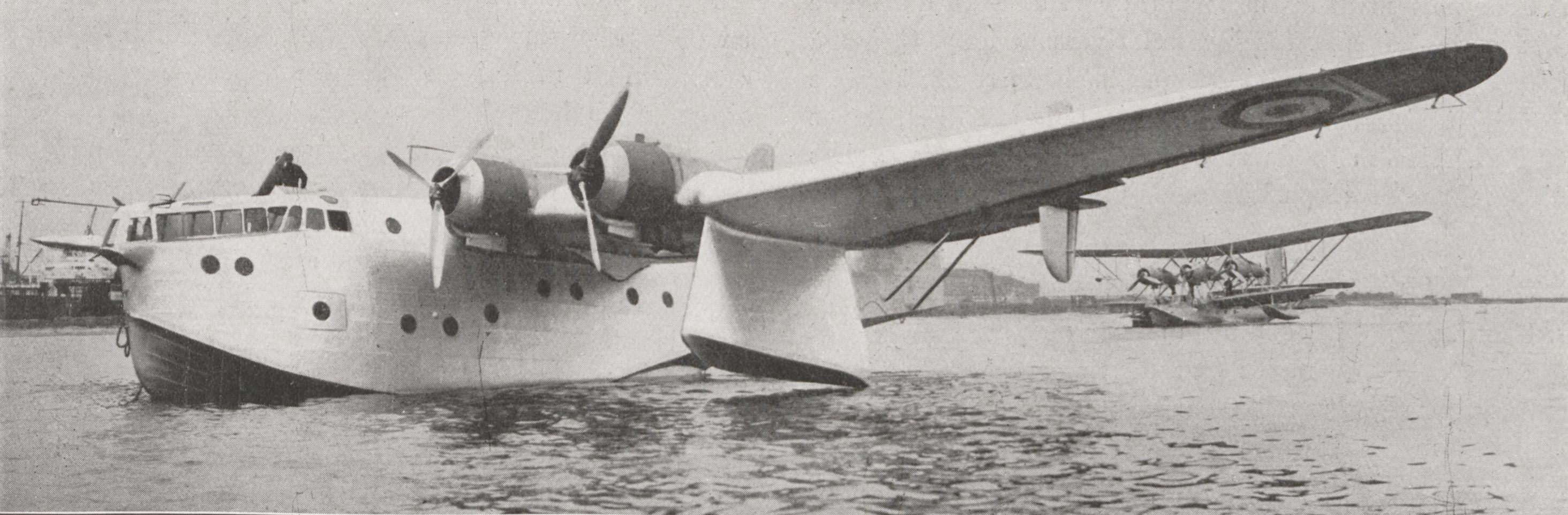
- The prototype Bréguet 730 in 1938.

General information
- Type: Reconnaissance Flying Boat
- Manufacturer: Bréguet
- Primary user: French Navy
- Number built: 5

History
- Introduction date: 1945
- First flight: 4 April 1938 (Br 730); 2 September 1947 (Br 731)
- Retired: 1954

The Bréguet 730 was a French flying boat of the 1930s. Built to meet the requirements of the French Navy, it was ordered into production but no aircraft were delivered prior to the Fall of France to Germany in June 1940. Four remaining incomplete airframes were completed after the end of World War II, serving with the French Navy until 1954.

== Development ==
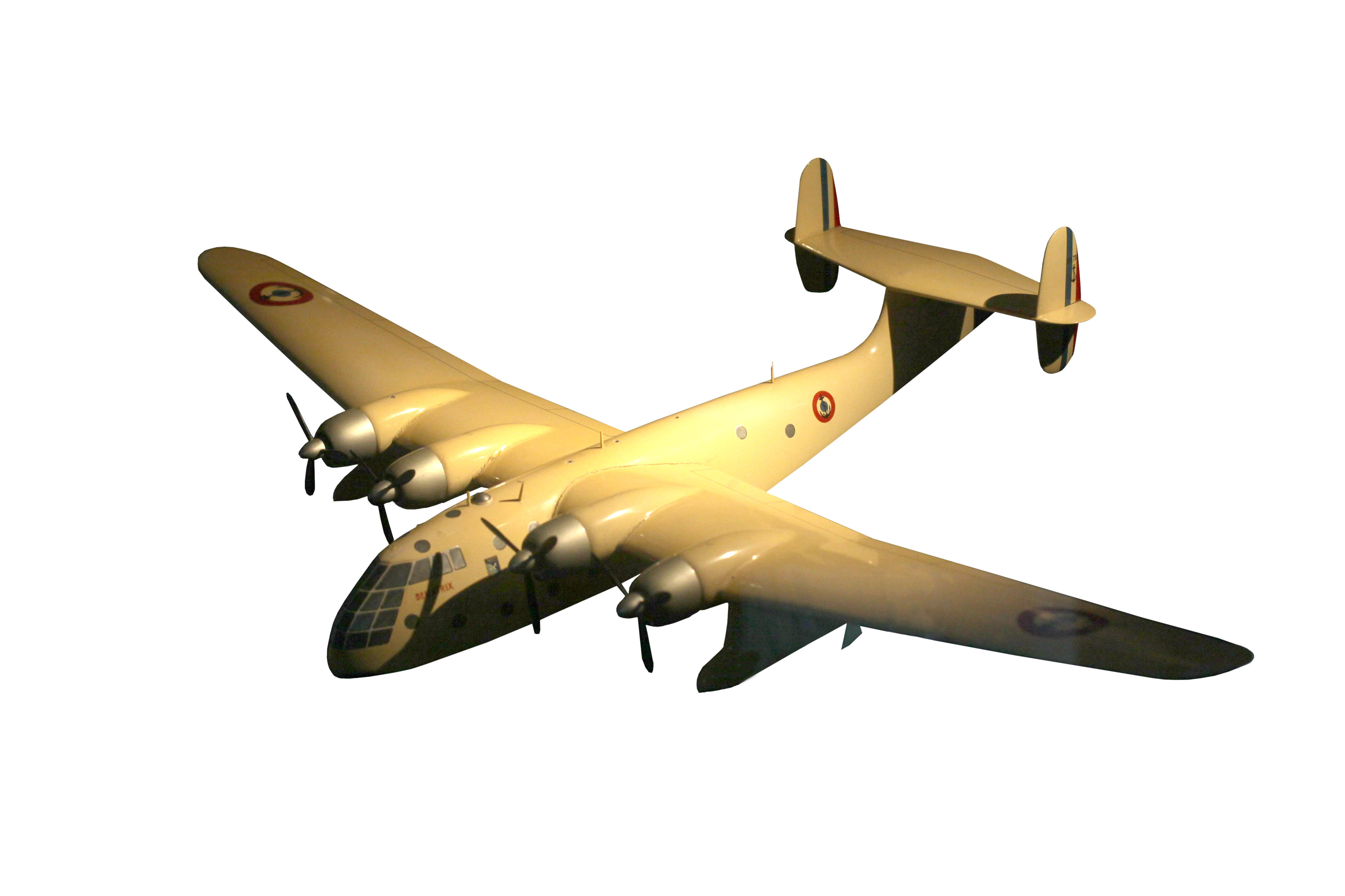
Bréguet 731 Bellatrix model at Musée national de la Marine.

The French Navy issued a specification for a new long-range flying boat to replace the obsolete 521 Bizerte in May 1935. Bréguet designed a large four engined flying boat to meet the requirement, the Breguet 730, competing against designs by Latécoère (the Latécoère 611), Lioré et Olivier (the LeO H-440) and Potez-CAMS (the Potez-CAMS 141).

The first prototype, the Br.730-01, powered by 750 kW (1,010 hp) Gnome-Rhône 14N-2 and Gnome-Rhône 14N-3 engines, flew on 4 April 1938 at Le Havre. The N-2 engines were fitted at No.1 and No.3 positions and the N-3s at No.2 and No.4 positions, rotating in opposite directions. It was wrecked, however, on 16 July 1938 when it attempted to land in shallow water. Despite this setback, however, an order for four production aircraft was placed, followed by a contract for unlimited production on the outbreak of World War II in September 1939. This order was cut in early 1940 when it realised that attrition of maritime patrol aircraft was relatively low.

== Operational history ==
Bréguet 730

No production aircraft had been completed when France surrendered on 22 June 1940, when production was suspended. Work was restarted by the Vichy government, with the wing of the wrecked prototype being combined with the hull of the first production machine to produce the Br. 730 No.1, which was ready to fly when the German invasion of Vichy France prevented testing. Production of the remaining 11 aircraft continued extremely slowly under German occupation, with eight being destroyed in an Allied air raid on 6 April 1944.

The Br.730 No.1 was finally flown for the first time in December 1944, after the Germans retreated from the South of France. This aircraft, named Véga, was delivered to the French Navy, who used it as a long-range transport in April 1945, with a second Br.730 (Sirius) completed in May 1946. The remaining two aircraft (Altair and Bellatrix) were completed with redesigned nose, new floats and more powerful engines, and were designated Br.731.

Véga was destroyed in a crash in January 1949, with a second aircraft being destroyed in 1951. The last Br.731 was retired on 20 January 1954.

== Variants ==
Br.730-01
Prototype. Powered by four 753 kW (1,010 hp) Gnome-Rhône 14N 2/3 engines.
Br.730
Production version. Powered by four 835 kW (1,120 hp) Gnome-Rhône 14N 44/45 engines. Two built.
Br.731
Modified nose and floats. Powered by 1,010 kW (1,350 hp) Gnome-Rhône 14R 200/201 engines. Two built.

== Operators ==
France

- French Navy

== Specifications (Br.730) ==
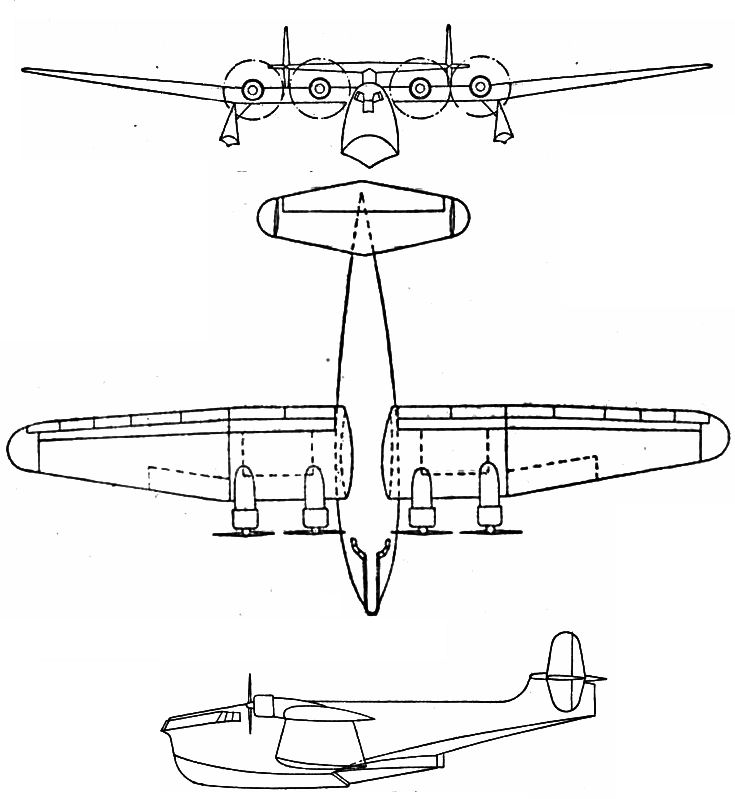
Bregeut 730 3-view drawing from L'Aerophile January 1944

Data from Warplanes of the Second World War, Volume Five, Flying Boats, Jane's all the World's Aircraft 1947

General characteristics

- Crew: 10
- Length: 24.38 m (80 ft 0 in)
- Wingspan: 40.37 m (132 ft 5 in)
- Height: 8.6 m (28 ft 3 in)
- Wing area: 173.1 m^{2} (1,863 sq ft)
- Aspect ratio: 9.3
- Empty weight: 16,134 kg (35,569 lb)
- Gross weight: 28,660 kg (63,184 lb)
- Powerplant: 2 × Gnome-Rhône 14N-44 14-cylinder air-cooled radial piston engines, 836 kW (1,121 hp) each right hand rotation
- Powerplant: 2 × Gnome-Rhône 14N-45 14-cylinder air-cooled radial piston engines, 836 kW (1,121 hp) each left hand rotation
- Propellers: 3-bladed variable-pitch airscrews

Performance

- Maximum speed: 330 km/h (210 mph, 180 kn)
- Cruise speed: 230 km/h (140 mph, 120 kn)
- Range: 6,923 km (4,302 mi, 3,738 nmi)
- Endurance: 30 hours
- Service ceiling: 6,000 m (20,000 ft)
- Time to altitude: 3,000 m (9,800 ft) in nine minutes
- Wing loading: 165 kg/m^{2} (34 lb/sq ft)
- Power/mass: 0.117 kW/kg (0.071 hp/lb)

== See also ==
Aircraft of comparable role, configuration, and era

- Latécoère 611
- Potez-CAMS 141

Related lists

- List of flying boats and floatplanes
