= Seenotdienst =

Germany military organization (1935–1945)

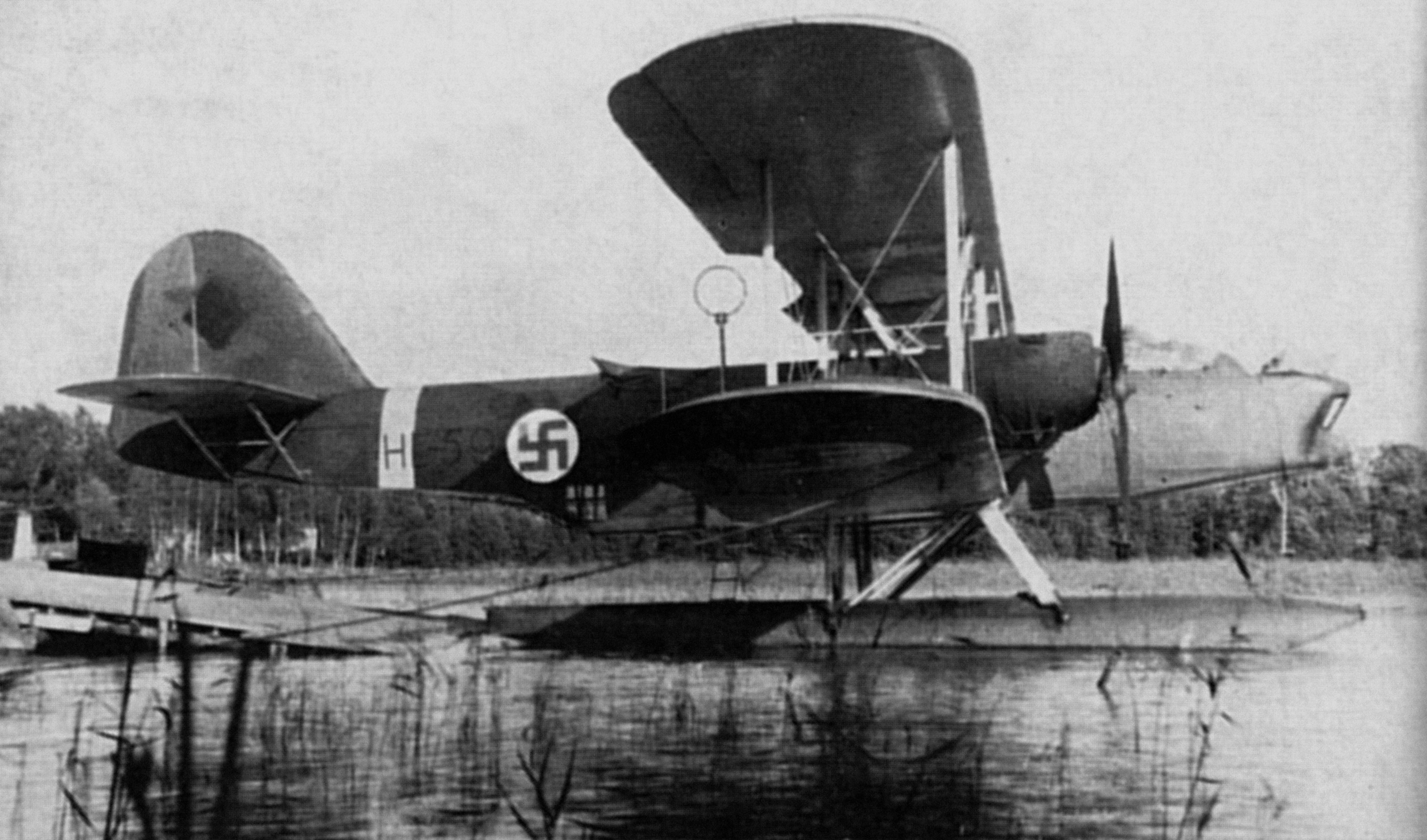
The German Seenotdienst operated 14 Heinkel He 59 floatplanes, like this Finnish Air Force example, and a variety of fast boats.

The Seenotdienst (sea rescue service) was a German military organization formed within the Luftwaffe (German Air Force) to save downed airmen from emergency water landings. The Seenotdienst operated from 1935 to 1945 and was the first organized air-sea rescue service.

The Seenotdienst was at first operated as a civilian service run by the military, and later was brought formally into the Luftwaffe. Throughout their existence, the group solved a number of organizational, operational and technical challenges to create an effective rescue force. When British and American air leaders observed the German success, they modeled their own rescue forces after the Seenotdienst. As the Allies of World War II advanced, denying sea areas to German forces, local groups of the Seenotdienst were disbanded. The last active group served in the Baltic Sea in March 1945.

== 1930s ==
In 1935, Lieutenant Colonel Konrad Goltz of the Luftwaffe, a supply officer based at the port of Kiel, was given the task of organizing the Seenotdienst, an air-sea rescue organization that would focus on the North Sea and the Baltic Sea. Goltz gained coordination with aircraft units of the Kriegsmarine as well as with civilian lifeboat societies and the German Maritime Search and Rescue Service (DGzRS, or "Deutsche Gesellschaft zur Rettung Schiffbrüchiger"). He held administrative command over the Ships and Boats Group which was organized at Kiel within the Luftwaffe. Goltz was to operate the Seenotdienst as a civilian organization composed of both military and civilian personnel, with civil registrations applied to the aircraft.

Red cross markings were painted on the rescue units

Early in 1939, with the growing probability of war against Great Britain, the Luftwaffe carried out large-scale rescue exercises over water. Land-based German bombers used for search duties proved inadequate in range, so bomber air bases were constructed along the coast to facilitate an air net over the Baltic and North seas. Following this, the Luftwaffe determined to procure a dedicated air-sea rescue seaplane, choosing a modification of the Heinkel He 59, a twin-engine biplane with floats.

A total of 14 He 59s of the oldest models were sent to be fitted with first aid equipment, electrically heated sleeping bags, artificial respiration equipment, a floor hatch with a telescoping ladder to reach the water, a hoist, signaling devices, and lockers to hold all the gear. The Heinkel He 59s were painted white with red crosses to indicate emergency services. A varied collection of small surface craft were placed under the command of the air-sea rescue division.

== World War II ==
The first multiple air-sea rescue operation occurred on December 18, 1939. A group of 24 British Vickers Wellington medium bombers were frustrated by low clouds and fog in their mission to bomb Wilhelmshaven, and they turned for home. The formation attracted the energetic attention of Luftwaffe pilots flying Bf 109 fighter aircraft as well as Bf 110 heavy fighters, and more than half of the Wellingtons went down in the North Sea. German Seenotdienst rescue boats based at Hörnum worked with He 59s to save some twenty British airmen from the icy water.

In 1940, as the German advance moved to occupy Denmark and Norway, the Seenotdienst added bases along the coasts of those countries. A squadron of obsolescent Dornier Do 18s that had been used for sea reconnaissance was assigned to air-sea rescue. Some of the Heinkels that had been flying out of the island of Sylt were transferred to Aalborg in northern Denmark. The two bases in Norway were located at Stavanger and Bergen. In many cases local rescue societies cooperated with the Seenotdienst.

When the Netherlands and France fell to the German advance in May and June 1940, more rescue bases were put into operation. The Hague and Schellingwoude became rescue bases in the Netherlands, and Boulogne and Cherbourg in France hosted rescue units that were soon to be active during the Battle of Britain. In July 1940, the Seenotdienst was taken formally into the Luftwaffe, becoming Luftwaffeninspektion 16 (German Air Force Inspectorate 16) under the direction of Generalleutnant Hans-Georg von Seidel, the Quartermaster General of the Luftwaffe, and thus indirectly under General der Flieger Hans Jeschonnek, the Chief of the Luftwaffe General Staff.

Dutch rescue craft belonging to the Noord- en zuid-Hollandsche Redding Maatschappij (NZHRM, translated North and South Holland Sea Rescue Institution) and the Zuid-Hollandsche Maatschappij tot Redding van Schipbreukelingen (ZHMRS, translated South Holland Institution for Rescue of Castaways) were incorporated into the Seenotdienst during the occupation of the Netherlands. The fast motor life boats were painted white with red crosses, though twice the boats were strafed by Allied aircraft. Civilian boatmen enjoyed good relations with German authorities. Between 1940 and 1945, the Dutch boats saved some 1,100 seamen and airmen. Near the end of the occupation some local boat commanders defied the Nazi regime, and three Dutch lifeboats escaped across the Channel, one carrying 40 Jews to sanctuary in England.

In response to the heavy toll of German air action against Great Britain in July–August 1940, Adolf Galland recommended that German pilots in trouble over the ocean make an emergency water landing in their aircraft, instead of bailing out and parachuting down. The aircraft each carried an inflatable rubber raft which would help the airmen avoid hypothermia from continued immersion in the cold water, and increase the time available for rescue. By comparison, British fighters such the Supermarine Spitfire and the Hawker Hurricane did not carry inflatable rafts, only life jackets which were little help against the cold.

In July 1940, a white-painted He 59 operating near Deal, Kent was shot down and the crew taken captive because it was sharing the air with 12 Bf 109 fighters and the British were wary of Luftwaffe aircraft dropping spies and saboteurs. The German pilot's log showed that he had noted the position and direction of British convoys—British officials determined that this constituted military reconnaissance, not rescue work.

The Air Ministry issued Bulletin 1254 indicating that all enemy air-sea rescue aircraft were to be destroyed if encountered. Winston Churchill later wrote "We did not recognise this means of rescuing enemy pilots who had been shot down in action, in order that they might come and bomb our civil population again." Germany protested this order on the grounds that rescue aircraft were part of the Geneva Convention agreement stipulating that belligerents must respect each other's "mobile sanitary formations" such as field ambulances and hospital ships. Churchill argued that rescue aircraft were not anticipated by the treaty, and were not covered.

British attacks on He 59s increased. The Seenotdienst ordered the rescue aircraft armed and painted in the camouflage scheme of their area of operation. The use of civil registration and red cross markings was abandoned. A Seenotdienst gunner shot down an attacking No. 43 Squadron RAF Hurricane fighter on July 20. Rescue flights were to be protected by fighter aircraft when possible.

In August, a few captured French and Dutch seaplanes were modified for rescue and attached to the organization. Some three-engined Dornier Do 24 flying boats that were built in the Netherlands, and eight French Bréguet 521 Bizerte models were refitted with standard Seenotdienst rescue supplies. Further bases set up at Le Havre, Brest, St. Nazaire and Royan. More aircraft were brought under Seenotdienst command on an ad hoc basis, depending on the urgency.

On May 22, 1941, in the Mediterranean Sea off the coast of Crete, a squadron of Do 24s was called upon to rescue survivors of the sinking of the Gloucester—some 65 British sailors were picked up. In the battle for Malta, some 1,000 rescue missions were flown by Do 24s, with many shot down. In saving Italian sailors from the battleship Roma, four out of five Do 24T aircraft were shot down. The fifth flying boat rescued 19 men.

=== British and American response ===
During the first two years of war, the British Royal Air Force Marine Branch had no coordinated air-sea rescue units—only about 28 crash boats and no dedicated aircraft. The ditching of a British aeroplane in the Channel or the North Sea usually doomed its crew. The fate of downed airmen was primarily in the hands of their parent organization, and they had little they could do to help the crash boats locate the accident site.

In January 1941, a Directorate of Air-Sea Rescue was formed by the Royal Air Force for the purpose of saving those in distress at sea, especially airmen. Proper provisioning of rescue squadrons was slow, and it took more than a year for sea-going rescue boats and aircraft to come together in active ASR squadrons. Between February and August 1941, of the 1,200 British airmen that landed in the Channel or the North Sea, 444 were rescued, with 78 more picked up and interned by the Seenotdienst. The organization copied much from the successful efforts of the Seenotdienst.

In September 1942, British air-sea rescue units began to work with the United States Army Air Forces to coordinate rescue activities over the Channel and the North Sea. Observers from the U.S. took cues from both the Seenotdienst and the British rescue operations. The combined US-UK effort led to the saving of some 2,000 American fliers from the seas around the UK. From the time of its inception to the end of the war, the British effort alone rescued 13,629 people from the ocean, 8,000 of which were airmen.

=== Retreat ===
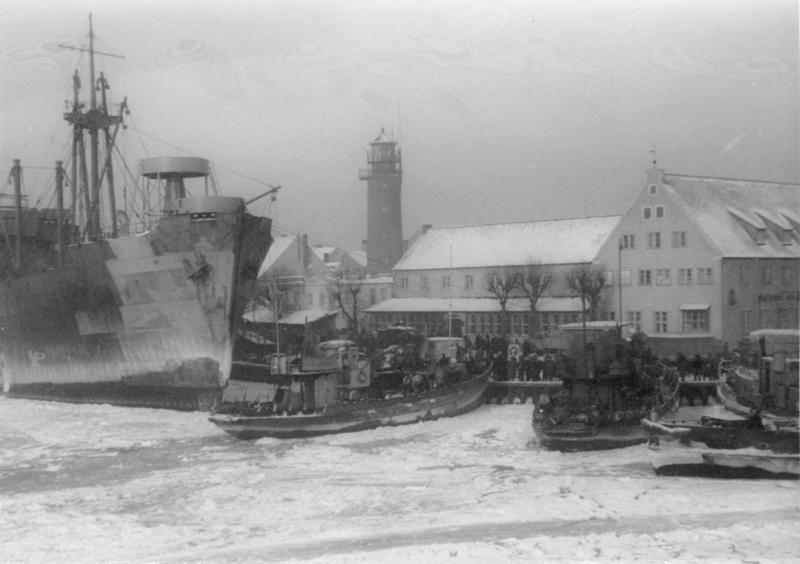
Pillau, January 1945. Boats and aircraft of the Seenotdienst helped evacuate thousands of German citizens during the last four months of war.

As the Allies advanced following the invasion of Normandy in June 1944, the Luftwaffe pulled bases back to keep them from being overrun. Units of the Seenotdienst whose areas of operation were threatened by Allied activity were disbanded or reorganized into other groups with safer locations.

For instance, in July 1944, surrounded by the U.S. VIII Corps gathering to attack Brest, Seenotstaffel 1 that had been operating there since June 1940, with a southern detachment at Hourtin, was sent to Pillau in the Baltic Sea, then redesignated Seenotstaffel 60 in August. In November 1944, German leadership decided that the flying boat manufacturing resources could be put to better use elsewhere, and ordered the Dornier factory to cease making Do 24s.

The most persons that a single Seenotdienst aircraft rescued in one sortie was 99 children and 14 adults carried by a Do 24, saved from orphanages threatened by the Soviet advance into Koszalin during the Battle of Kolberg at the beginning of March 1945. The load was so great that the aircraft was unable to take off—instead, it wave-hopped and taxied back to base. During the same battle, six boats working with the Seenotdienst made repeated trips March 17–18 to a pier in Kolberg and evacuated 2,356 people.

== Rescue equipment ==
During the Battle of Britain, a problem that the Seenotdienst observed among both British and German aircrew was termed Rettungskollaps (rescue collapse)—a number of rescued fliers lost consciousness and died some 20–90 minutes after being pulled from the icy water. Investigation into the matter was initiated, including experiments on prisoners at Dachau concentration camp which involved submersing men in extremely cold water to induce hypothermia. The human subjects were then warmed up using methods under analysis such as being wrapped in an electrically heated sleeping bag, or being bathed in warm or hot water. Some 80–100 prisoners died in the process.

In October 1940 at the suggestion of Ernst Udet, yellow-painted Rettungsbojen (sea rescue buoys) were placed by the Germans in waters where air emergencies were likely. The highly visible buoy-type floats held emergency equipment including food, water, blankets and dry clothing enough for four men, and they attracted distressed airmen from both sides of the conflict. British airmen and seamen called them "Lobster Pots" for their shape. German and British rescue boats checked the floats from time to time, picking up any airmen they found, though enemy airmen were immediately made prisoner of war.

The Seenotdienst carried out its own studies that determined which new rescue inventions were to be incorporated throughout the Luftwaffe. A bright green fluorescein dye was found to be useful to mark the area of a water landing, and all German aircraft began to carry the dye. Compact inflatable dinghies were developed for all combat aircraft, even single-engine fighters.

== Aircraft used ==
- Arado Ar 196
- Arado Ar 199
- Breguet Br.521 Bizerte
- Cant Z.506
- Dornier Do 18
- Dornier Do 24
- Focke-Wulf Fw 58
- Focke-Wulf Fw 190
- Heinkel He 59
- Heinkel He 60
- Heinkel He 114
- Heinkel He 115
- Junkers Ju 52
- Junkers W 34

== See also ==
- Combat search and rescue (the modern term for operations of this type)

== Bibliography ==
- Born, Karl. Rettung zwischen den Fronten: Seenotdienst der deutschen Luftwaffe 1939–1945. (Rescue Between the Fronts: German Air Force Sea Rescue Service). Mittler, 1996. ISBN 3-8132-0489-8
- Boyne, Walter J. Beyond the Wild Blue: A History of the U.S. Air Force, 1947–1997. Macmillan, 1998. ISBN 0-312-18705-X
- Dierich, Wolfgang, editor. Stiftung Luftwaffenehrenmal e.V. Die Verbände der Luftwaffe: 1935–1945: Gliederungen u. Kurzchroniken: Eine Dokumentation. (The Air Force Units: 1935–1945: Structures and Short Chronicles: A Documentation). Motorbuch-Verlag, 1976. ISBN 3-87943-437-9
- Evans, Clayton. Rescue at sea: An International History of Lifesaving, Coastal Rescue Craft and Organisations. Naval Institute Press, 2003. ISBN 1-59114-713-1
- Nicolaou, Stéphane. Flying boats & Seaplanes: A History from 1905. Zenith Imprint, 1998. ISBN 0-7603-0621-4
- Nielsen, Andreas. The German Air Force General Staff. Issue 173 of USAF historical studies. Ayer Publishing, 1968. ISBN 0-405-00043-X
- Thurling, Horst. Die 7. Seenotstaffel: 1941–1944. (The 7th Sea Rescue Staffel: 1941–1944). Horst Thurling, 1997. ISBN 978-3-932403-01-9
- Tilford, Earl H., Jr., Captain, USAF. "Seenotdienst: Early Development of Air-Sea Rescue", Air University Review, January–February 1977
- Tilford, Earl H., Jr. Search and Rescue in Southeast Asia, pp. 4–8. Center for Air Force History. DIANE Publishing, 1992. ISBN 1-4289-9284-7
- Wadman, David; Adam Thompson. (2009) Seeflieger: Luftwaffe Maritime Aircraft and Units, 1935–1945. Classic Publications. ISBN 1-903223-97-0
