= Jean C. Romatet =

Jean Charles Romatet
- Born: 23 May 1893; Borgo, Corsica, France
- Died: 15 May 1975 (aged 81)
- Military career
- Allegiance: France; Vichy France
- Branch: French Army; French Air Force; Vichy French Air Force
- Rank: Lieutenant (later Lieutenant General)
- Units: Escadrille 38; Escadrille Spa.76
- Commands: Escadrille 165; Air Forces, French West Africa; 22nd Air Brigade; Vichy French Air Force
- Conflicts: World War I World War II
- Awards: Legion d'Honneur; Croix de Guerre

Jean Charles Romatet (17 May 1896 – 15 May 1975) was a French military officer who served as a general in World War II. He began his career during World War I as a flying ace credited with seven aerial victories.

== Biography ==
Romatet was born on 17 May 1894 in Borgo, Corsica.

He began his military career during World War I in the French Army on 10 October 1912; after seasoning as a cavalryman, he entered military school as an Aspirant on 12 October 1913. On 5 August 1914, he was appointed as Sous lieutenant. He transferred to the French Air Force on 30 November 1916 as an aerial observer. On 15 January 1917, he was posted to Escadrille 38; on 30 April 1917, he was granted his observer's brevet.

Next came a posting to pilot's training, starting 7 September 1917. On 8 November, he was awarded his Military Pilot's Brevet. After advanced training, he was posted to Escadrille Spa.76 as a fighter pilot on 22 February 1918. He was transferred to command Escadrille Spa.165. Romatet became a flying ace credited with seven confirmed victories (4 victories with Escadrille Spa.76 and 3 victories with Escadrille Spa.165).

He rose to the rank of general during World War II while commanding Groupe 23 at Laon-Chambly. He served as chief of staff of the Vichy French Air Force from 1940 to 1942.

Romatet died on 15 May 1975.

== Career Details ==
- 1932 Lieutenant Colonel - Commanding Officer Air Forces, French West Africa
- 1937 Became Temporary Commanding Officer 22nd Air Brigade and Director of Teaching, École de l'Air
- 1938 Attached to the Ministry of National Defence
- 1938 Second Deputy Chief of the Air Staff
- 1939 Promoted to Brigadier-General
- 1940 First Deputy Chief of the Air Staff
- 1940-1942 Chief of the Air Staff - promoted to major-general and later to lieutenant general
