= Bréguet 521 Bizerte =

French long-range reconnaissance seaplane

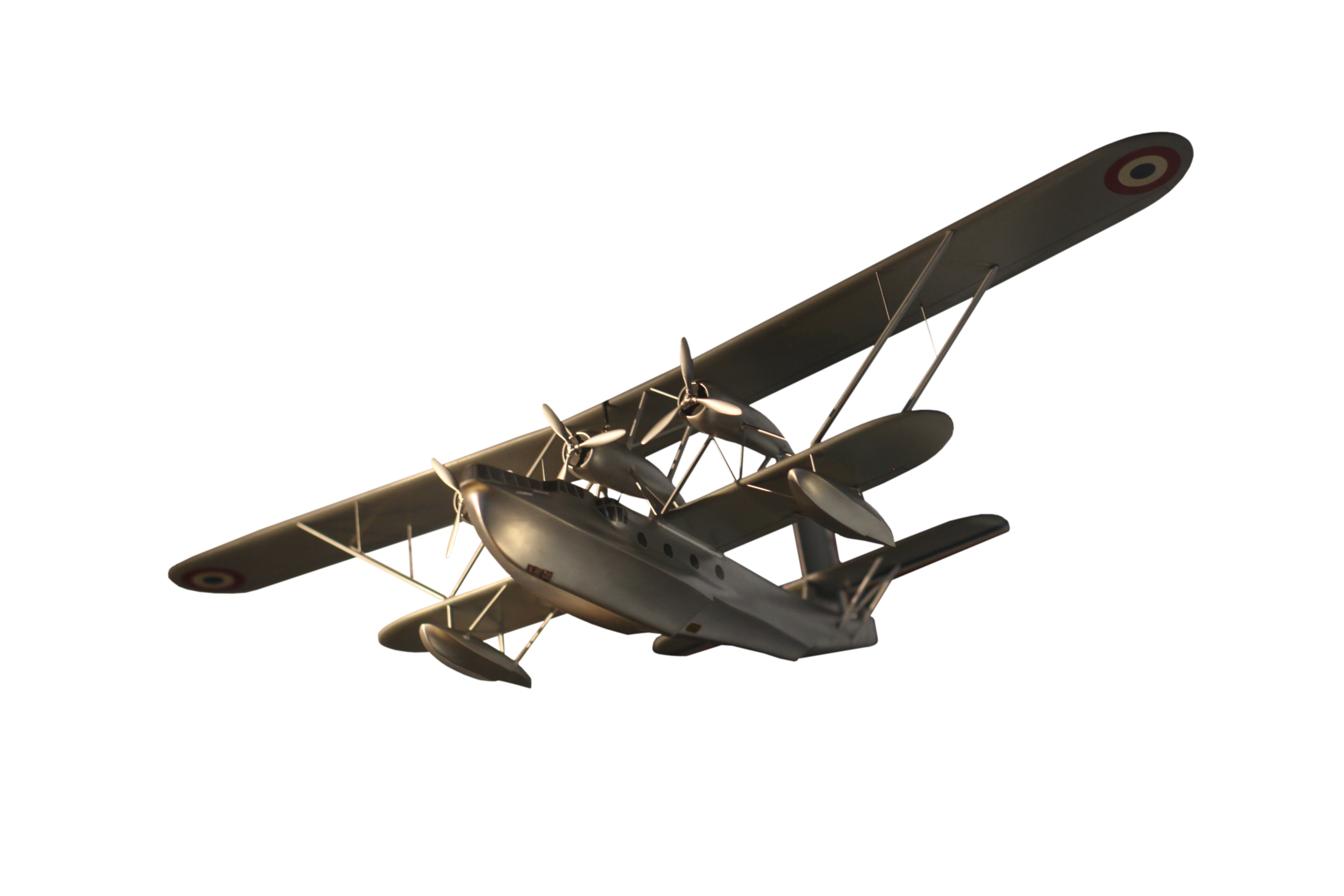
- Model of a Breguet 521. On display at the Musée national de la Marine, Paris.

General information
- Type: Flying boat
- Manufacturer: Breguet
- Primary users: French Navy / Vichy French Navy Luftwaffe
- Number built: 37

History
- Introduction date: 1935
- First flight: 11 September 1933
- Developed from: Short S.8 Calcutta

The Bréguet 521 Bizerte was a long-range military reconnaissance flying boat built by the French aviation company Breguet.

== Development ==
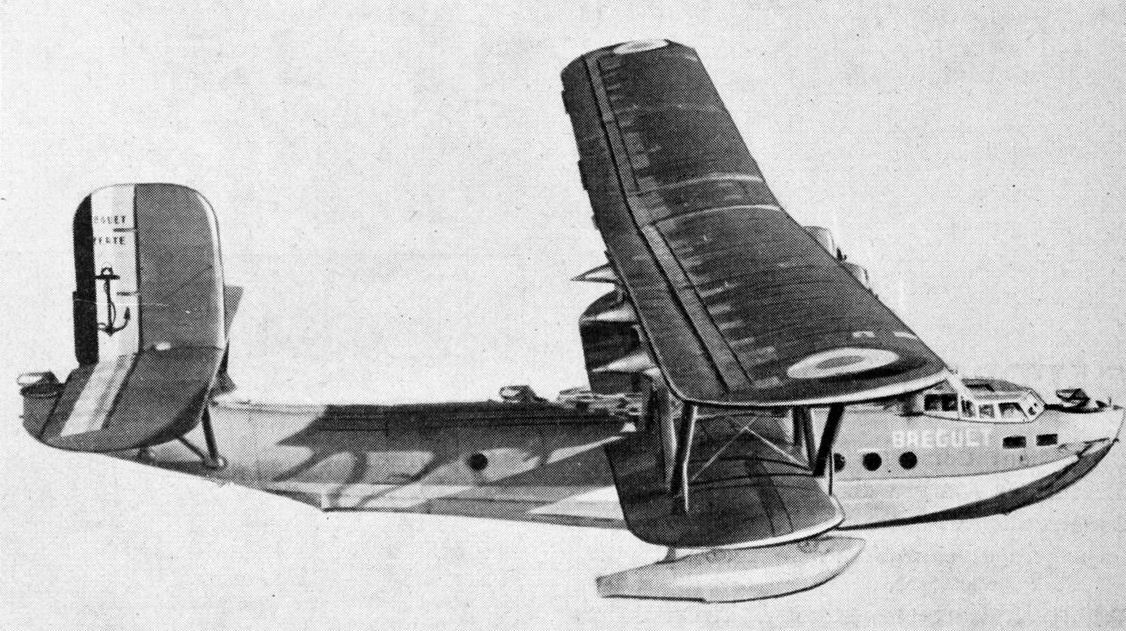
Breguet 521 photo from Le Pontentiel Aérien Mondial 1936

An all-metal sesquiplane with three engines mounted in nacelles between the upper and lower wings, the aircraft was a development of the Breguet S.8/2 Calcutta, which itself was a militarised licensed version of the British Short S.8 Calcutta. It was built to meet a 1932 French Navy specification for a long-range flying boat, competing against proposals from Latécoère (the 582), Lioré et Olivier (the unbuilt LeO H42) and Loire Aviation (the Loire 70). The prototype made its first flight on 11 September 1933, which resulted in the prototype being purchased, and an order placed for two more on 4 January 1934.

A series of small orders for production Bizertes was placed, starting with an order for three in 1934, with the last order, for 12 (nine of which were later cancelled) being placed in September 1939. In total, 37 Bizertes were built, with the last three not being completed until after the French surrender in June 1940.

In 1935 a civilian version – the Breguet Br.530 Saigon – was produced.

== Operational history ==
After the first flight in September 1933, 37 aircraft were produced, which served with five squadrons of the French Navy from 1935 until 1940. Two squadrons remained in service with the Vichy Navy after the armistice, at Berre in Southern France and Karouba in Tunisia, with six aircraft each. The German Luftwaffe purchased a number of Bizertes for its Seenotdienst (Air-Sea Rescue) service in 1940, which (in addition to the three undelivered Bizertes) it used to equip a squadron based at Brest on the French Atlantic coast. When Vichy France was occupied by the Germans following the Allied invasion of North Africa in November 1942, the remaining Vichy Bizertes were taken over by the Luftwaffe, allowing further Seenotdienst units to be established at Biscarrosse and Berre. Following the Allied Invasion of Southern France in August 1944, one of the Luftwaffe Bizertes was discovered by French forces and used for communications duties until spares ran out.

== Variants ==
Breguet 521.01
Prototype, powered by three Gnome-Rhône 14Kdrs 14-cylinder two-row radial engines
Breguet 521 Bizerte
Long-range flying boat, powered by three Gnome-Rhône 14Kirs 14-cylinder two-row radial engines or three Gnome-Rhône 14N radial engines.
Breguet 522
Re-engined version of Breguet 521. Three 670 kW (900 hp) Hispano-Suiza 14AA radial engines. One built.
Breguet 530 Saigon
Civil version of the Breguet 521. Three Hispano-Suiza 12Ybr liquid-cooled inlines. Two built.

== Specifications (Br.521) ==

Data from Warplanes of the Second World War. Vol. 5. Flying Boats, The encyclopedia of military aircraft

General characteristics

- Crew: 8
- Length: 20.48 m (67 ft 2 in)
- Wingspan: 35.18 m (115 ft 5 in)
- Height: 7.5 m (24 ft 7 in)
- Wing area: 162.6 m^{2} (1,750 sq ft)
- Empty weight: 9,470 kg (20,878 lb)
- Gross weight: 15,091 kg (33,271 lb)
- Max takeoff weight: 16,600 kg (36,597 lb)
- Fuel capacity: 5,250.7 L (1,387 US gal; 1,155 imp gal)
- Powerplant: 3 × Gnome-Rhône 14Kirs1 14-cylinder two-row air-cooled radial piston engine, 670 kW (900 hp) each
- Propellers: 3-bladed variable-pitch propellers

Performance

- Maximum speed: 243 km/h (151 mph, 131 kn) at 1,000 m (3,300 ft)
- Cruise speed: 164 km/h (102 mph, 89 kn) economical cruise
- Normal Cruising speed 199 km/h (124 mph; 107 kn)
- Range: 2,100 km (1,300 mi, 1,100 nmi) at normal cruise at 1,000 m (3,300 ft)
- Maximum range: at economical cruise 3,000 km (1,900 mi; 1,600 nmi)
- Service ceiling: 6,000 m (19,685 ft)
- Time to altitude: 2,000 m (6,600 ft) in 8 min 46 sec; 3,000 m (9,800 ft) in 14 min 30 sec
- Wing loading: 90.2 kg/m^{2} (18.5 lb/sq ft)
- Power/mass: 0.137 kW/kg (0.083 hp/lb)

Armament

- Guns: 5 × 7.5 mm (0.295 in) Darne machine guns
- Bombs: 4 × 75 kg (165 lb) bombs underwing

== Operators ==
France

- Aviation Navale
- Air France operated 37 Br.530s from 1935

Vichy France

- Vichy French Air Force

Nazi Germany

- Luftwaffe 8 seized aircraft were used for air-sea rescue.

== See also ==
- Latécoère 611
- Potez-CAMS 141

Related development

- Short S.8 Calcutta

Related lists

- List of aircraft of World War II
- List of military aircraft of France
- List of flying boats and floatplanes

== Bibliography ==
- Bousquet, Gérard (August 1985). "Le Breguet Bizerte dans la Luftwaffe" [The Breguet Bizerte in the Luftwaffe]. Le Fana de l'Aviation (in French) (189): 17–22. ISSN 0757-4169.
- Bousquet, Gérard (2013). French Flying Boats of WW II. Sandomierz, Poland: Stratus. ISBN 978-83-63678-06-7.
- Lacaze, Henri (2016). Les avions Louis Breguet Paris [The Aircraft of Louis Breguet, Paris] (in French). Vol. 2: le règne du monoplan. Le Vigen, France. ISBN 978-2-914017-89-3.
- Nicolaou, Stéphane (1996). Flying Boats & Seaplanes: A History from 1905. Devon, UK: Bay View Books. p. 82. ISBN 978-1901432206.
