= Vichy French Air Force =

Air Force
- Roundel
- Active: 22 June 1940 – December 1942
- Disbanded: December 1942
- Country: French State
- Allegiance: French State
- Type: Air force
- Role: Aerial warfare
- Engagements: World War II

Commanders
- Notable commanders: General Jean Romatet

Aircraft flown
- Bomber: Amiot 143; Amiot 351; Bloch MB.131; Bloch MB.174; Bloch MB.200; Breguet Bre.693; Breguet Bre.695; Douglas DB-7; Farman F.222; Latécoère 298; Farman NC.223; Lioré-et-Olivier LeO 45; Lioré et Olivier LeO H-257bis; Lioré et Olivier LeO H-258; Loire-Nieuport LN.411; Martin 167F; Lioré et Olivier LeO H-47; Latécoère 611
- Interceptor: Potez 631; Caudron-Renault CR.714 Cyclone; Bloch MB.151; Bloch MB.152; Bloch MB.155; Curtiss Hawk 75; Dewoitine D.520; Morane-Saulnier MS.406
- Reconnaissance: Loire 130; Potez 25; Potez-CAMS 141; Potez 63.11; Breguet Bre.270 A.2; Breguet Bre.521 Bizerte; North American NA-64; CAMS 37; Potez 452
- Trainer: Morane-Saulnier MS.230; Morane-Saulnier MS.406; North American NA-57; North American NA-64; Romano R.82; de Havilland DH.82 Tiger Moth
- Transport: Potez 650; Caudron C.445 Goéland; Farman NC.223; Potez 650

The Air Force (French: Armée de l'Air), usually referred to as the Air Force of Vichy (Armée de l'air de Vichy) or Armistice Air Force (Armée de l'Air de l'armistice) for clarity, was the aerial branch of the Armistice Army of Vichy France established in the aftermath of the Fall of France in June 1940. The Vichy French Air Force existed between June 1940 and December 1942 and largely served to defend Vichy French territories abroad.

== History ==
The Vichy French Air Force used a similar roundel as the Armée de l'Air. the roundel was not used until the French surrender during the Fall of France. To distinguish themselves from the Vichy French aircraft, the Free French Forces adapted the Cross of Lorraine as their insignia.

After the Defeat of France, Marshal of France Henri-Philippe Pétain signed an armistice with Germany on 22 June 1940 which created Vichy France as a puppet state. however some of the people didn't want to join the Vichy Air force, Instead there were two type of people which include: those who wanted to escape from France and join the Free French Forces (Forces Françaises Libres) or those who stayed and flew for the French Armistice Air Force on behalf of the Vichy government. Initially the Germans wanted to disband the air force completely, and all personnel were to be demobilized by mid-September. However, on 3 July 1940, the British Royal Navy attacked the French fleet anchored in the Algerian ports of Oran and Mers-el-Kebir. This angered Vichy France, so the Vichy government broke all connections and ties with the British. Afterwards, the Germans agreed to the formation of a Vichy French air force.

=== June 1940 – December 1942 ===
In a parallel of what had happened to Germany after World War I, the French government, now with its seat moved to Vichy, agreed to accept German terms for a reduced army and navy, both of which would be only strong enough to maintain order in France and in its colonies. Germany ordered that military aircraft that had survived the Battle of France, including those now stationed in Tunisia, Algeria and Morocco, were to be surrendered either in whole or else already disassembled, or destroyed altogether – again a parallel of what befell Germany's air force in 1919.

However, Vichy France's air force was spared from non-existence by the consequences of an event which would damage, if not completely change, the relationship between occupied France and Britain. Winston Churchill had no intention of allowing French Navy capital ships to remain intact so long as there was any chance of them becoming adjuncts of the Kriegsmarine (German navy).

Churchill authorised a plan – codenamed "Operation Catapult" – for a British naval formation (Force H) based in Gibraltar to sail to the harbour of Mers-el-Kébir, near Oran, in Algeria. Four capital ships and other vessels were stationed at Mers-el-Kebir, Force H was to persuade Admiral Marcel-Bruno Gensoul to disobey orders from Vichy and take his vessels out of the war in Europe; by sailing to British ports or to French colonies in the Far East or even to the (still neutral) United States. The overture was soundly rejected, so Royal Navy Admiral Sir James Somerville gave the orders to destroy the French vessels. 1,297 French sailors died in the attack and one French battleship was sunk and two others severely damaged. The incident discredited the British in French eyes and gave the Germans a propaganda tool, depicting the British as France's real enemies. On 18 July the French air force half-heartedly bombed Gibraltar in response to the attack on the French Fleet. The bombing did little damage but caused the first casualties.

Vichy and Berlin agreed, if reluctantly, that the Armée de l'Air de Vichy (Vichy French Air Force) was still needed in case French interests were to be attacked by the British once again – and, of course, for attacking the British themselves. Goering ordered that all Vichy French Air Force aircraft would henceforth be identified by special markings on the fuselage and tailplane of each one. Initially, the rear fuselage and tailplane (excluding the rudder) were painted a bright yellow, although the markings were later changed so that they consisted of horizontal red and yellow stripes. In all cases, French national markings (roundel on the fuselage and French tricolour on the tailplane) were retained as before.

Nearly three months later, on 23 September 1940, the Vichy air force saw action again when the British tried to take Dakar, the capital of French West Africa (now Senegal). As at Mers-el-Kébir, after an attempt to persuade the Vichy French to join the Allied cause failed, British and Free French forces attacked the Vichy forces. However, this time the Vichy French managed to repulse the British torpedo-bomber attacks launched from the carrier HMS Ark Royal during several days of fighting with only light casualties on their side.

On 24 September, in response to the British attack at Dakar, the Vichy air force bombed British facilities at Gibraltar from French bases in North Africa. The bombing stopped the following day — the same day that the British withdrew from Dakar — but only after Gibraltar suffered heavy damage.

Syrian-based Vichy air force units saw action against the British from April 1941, when the 1941 Iraqi coup d'état briefly installed the nationalist Rashid Ali Al-Gaylani as prime minister, in order to secure the vital oil supplies at Kirkuk (under British control since 1934) in northeastern Iraq for the pro-Axis nationalists who wanted the British to be expelled from the country. However, the Royal Air Force (RAF) base at Habbaniya withstood the nationalists, and in May the British, Indian and Commonwealth "Iraqforce" invaded Iraq via Basra. The ensuing Anglo-Iraqi War ended with Iraqforce defeating the nationalists at the end of May and restoring a pro-Allied government in Iraq.

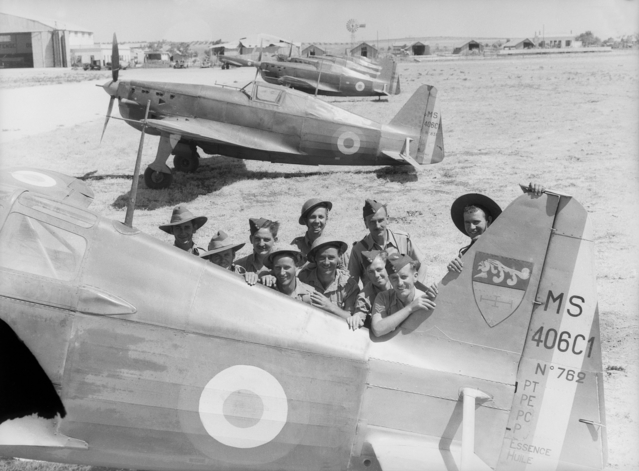
Australian soldiers pose with captured Morane-Saulnier MS.406 fighters at Neirab airfield in Syria in July 1941

Allied operations during the Anglo-Iraqi War included attacks on Vichy air force bases in Lebanon and Syria, which served as staging posts for Regia Aeronautica and Luftwaffe units flying to Mosul to support the Iraqi nationalist coup. Before the campaign in Iraq was over, the Allies decided to attack Vichy forces in Syria and Lebanon and occupy those countries. The Vichy French air force was relatively strong at the start of the campaign. In 1940, many of the aircraft stationed in Syria and Lebanon had been sent back to France. This left the Vichy French with only a number of obsolete models. However, alarmed by the growing threat of invasion, Vichy dispatched a fighter group from Algeria. Once the fighting began, three more groups were flown from France and from North Africa. This brought the strength of the Vichy French air force in Lebanon and Syria up to 289 aircraft, including about 35 Dewoitine D.520 fighters and some new, US-built Glenn Martin 167 light bombers. This initially gave the Vichy French a numerical advantage over the Allied air units.

The invasion began on 8 June 1941. RAF and Royal Australian Air Force (RAAF) squadrons launched direct attacks on Vichy airfields, destroying many French aircraft on the ground. D.520s of GC III/6, II/3 and naval escadrille 1AC faced the Allies in air-to-air combat, where they claimed 31 kills over British and Australian planes, while losing 11 of their own in air combat and 24 to anti-aircraft fire, accidents, and attacks on their airfields. However, No. 3 Squadron RAAF — which had just converted to the new P-40 Tomahawk I — claimed five D.520s destroyed for the loss of one P-40 in air combat. In all 179 Vichy aircraft were lost during the campaign, most having been destroyed on the ground. In mid-July 1941, after heavy losses, Vichy French forces surrendered Syria and Lebanon to the Allies.

=== Operation Torch, 8–10 November 1942 ===
The last major battles against the Allied forces, in which the Vichy French air force took part, took place during Operation Torch, launched on 8 November 1942 as the Allied invasion of North Africa. Facing the United States Navy task force headed for Morocco, consisting of the carriers Ranger, Sangamon, Santee and Suwannee, were, in part, Vichy squadrons based at Marrakesh, Meknes, Agadir, Casablanca and Rabat, which between them could muster some 86 fighters and 78 bombers. Overall, the aircraft may have been old compared to the F4F Wildcats of the U.S. Navy, yet they were still dangerous and capable in the hands of combat veterans who had seen action against both the Germans and the British since the start of the war.

F4Fs attacked the airfield at Rabat-Salé around 07.30 on the 8th and destroyed nine LeO 451 bombers of GB I/22, while a transport unit's full complement of various types was almost entirely wiped out. At Casablanca, SBD dive-bombers succeeded in damaging the French battleship, Jean Bart, and F4Fs strafed the bombers of GB I/32 at Camp Cazes airfield, some of which exploded as they were ready for take-off with bombs already on board, thus ensuring their mission never went ahead. Several F4F pilots were shot down and taken prisoner.

The day's victory tally of enemy aircraft shot down by the French fighter pilots totalled seven confirmed and three probable, yet their losses were considered heavy – five pilots killed, four wounded and 13 aircraft destroyed either in combat or on the ground – when one considers that GC II/5, based in Casablanca, had lost only two pilots killed during the whole of the six-week campaign in France two years before. In the meantime, F4Fs of U.S. Navy Fighter Squadron VF-41 from the USS Ranger strafed and destroyed three U.S.-built Douglas DB-7 bombers of GB I/32, which were being refuelled and rearmed at Casablanca, leaving three others undamaged.

Nevertheless, having been reinforced by two other bombers, GB I/32 carried out a bombing mission against the beaches at Safi, where more U.S. soldiers were landing, the next morning. One of the bombers was damaged and attempted to make a forced-landing, only to explode upon contact with the ground, killing the entire crew. Fighter unit GC I/5 lost four pilots in combat that day (9 November) and it was on that same day that Adjudant (Warrant Officer) Bressieux had the distinction of becoming the last pilot in the Vichy French air force to claim a combat victory, in this case an F4F of VF-9. Shortly afterwards, 13 F4Fs attacked the airfield at Médiouna and destroyed a total of 11 French aircraft, including six from GC II/5.

On the morning of 10 November 1942, the Vichy French air force units in Morocco had only 37 combat-ready fighters and 40 bombers left to face the U.S. Navy F4Fs. Médiouna was attacked once again and several of the fighters were left burning, while two reconnaissance Potez were shot down, one by an F4F and the other by an SBD over the airfield at Chichaoua, where three F4Fs would later destroy four more Potez in a strafing attack.

Ultimately, the presence of Vichy France in North Africa as an ally of the Germans came to an end on 11 November 1942, when General Charles Noguès, the commander-in-chief of the Vichy armed forces, requested a cease-fire – although that did not stop a unit of U.S. Navy aircraft attacking the airfield at Marrakech and destroying several French aircraft, apparently on the initiative of the unit's commander. Once the cease-fire request was accepted, the war between the Allies and the Vichy French came to an end.

"Torch" had resulted in a victory for the Allies, even though it was fair to say that the French had no choice but to engage the Americans, otherwise the Americans would (and did) engage them since they were technically enemies. As a result, 12 air force and 11 navy pilots died in the final four days of combat between Vichy France and the Allies during World War II. On 11 November the Germans invaded the then-unoccupied zone of metropolitan France and ordered the complete dissolution of the Vichy French armed forces on 1 December 1942.

== Commanders ==
General Jean C. Romatet: 23 September 1940 – 21 December 1942

== List of Aircraft ==
(includes Vichy Aeronavale)

=== Bombers ===
- Amiot 143
- Amiot 351
- Bloch MB.131
- Bloch MB.174
- Bloch MB.200
- Breguet Bre.693 & 695
- Douglas DB-7 B.3
- Farman F.222
- Latécoère 298
- Farman NC.223
- Lioré-et-Olivier LeO 45
- Lioré et Olivier LeO H-257bis & 258
- Loire-Nieuport LN.411
- Martin 167F
- Lioré et Olivier LeO H-47
- Latécoère 611
- Lioré et Olivier LeO H-257bis & 258

=== Reconnaissance ===
- Loire 130
- Potez 25 A-2/TOE
- Potez-CAMS 141
- Potez 63.11
- Breguet Bre.270 A.2
- Breguet Bre.521 Bizerte
- North American NA-64
- CAMS 37
- Potez 452

=== Trainers ===
- Morane-Saulnier MS.230
- Morane-Saulnier MS.406
- North American NA-57
- North American NA-64
- Romano R.82
- de Havilland DH.82 Tiger Moth

=== Fighters ===
- Potez 631
- Caudron-Renault CR.714 Cyclone
- Bloch MB.151, 152 & 155
- Curtiss Hawk 75
- Dewoitine D.520
- Morane-Saulnier MS.406

=== Transport ===
- Potez 650
- Caudron C.445 Goéland
- Farman NC.223
- Potez 650

== See also ==
- Bordeaux-Aéronautique
- French Colonial Empire
