= Escadrille Spa.76 =

- Active: 1916–1918
- Country: France
- Branch: French Air Service
- Type: Fighter/reconnaissance Squadron
- Battle honours: Mentioned in dispatches

Escadrille Spa.76 was a French fighter and reconnaissance squadron active during the First World War years of 1916 to 1918. Cited for taking more than 3,000 aerial photographs for military intelligence purposes, the unit was also credited with destroying 26 German aircraft.

== History ==
Escadrille Spa.76 was founded in August 1916 at Lyon. Its original equipment of Caudron R.IV bombers was quickly replaced by Nieuport fighters, and the new unit designated Escadrille N.76 before its 8 September transfer to the V Armee at Muizon.

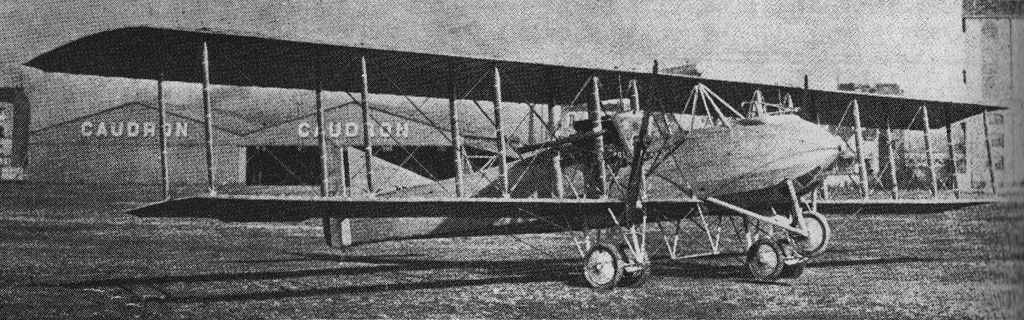
The Caudron R.IV was the squadron's original equipment.

It was refitted with SPAD S.VII and SPAD S.XIII fighters in late 1917, causing it to be renamed Escadrille Spa.76.

After the war's end, on 2 February 1919, Escadille Spa.76 would be mentioned in dispatches for having fought in 440 dogfights and destroying 26 German aircraft, as well as flying 70 reconnaissance missions resulting in more than 3,000 photographs.

== Commanding officers ==
- Capitaine Rene Doumer: August 1916 - missing in action 26 April 1917
- Capitaine Jean-Jacques Perrin: 26 April 1917 - ?
- Capitaine Eugene Verdon: ?
- Lieutenant Pierre Vitoux: 6 May 1917

== Aircraft ==
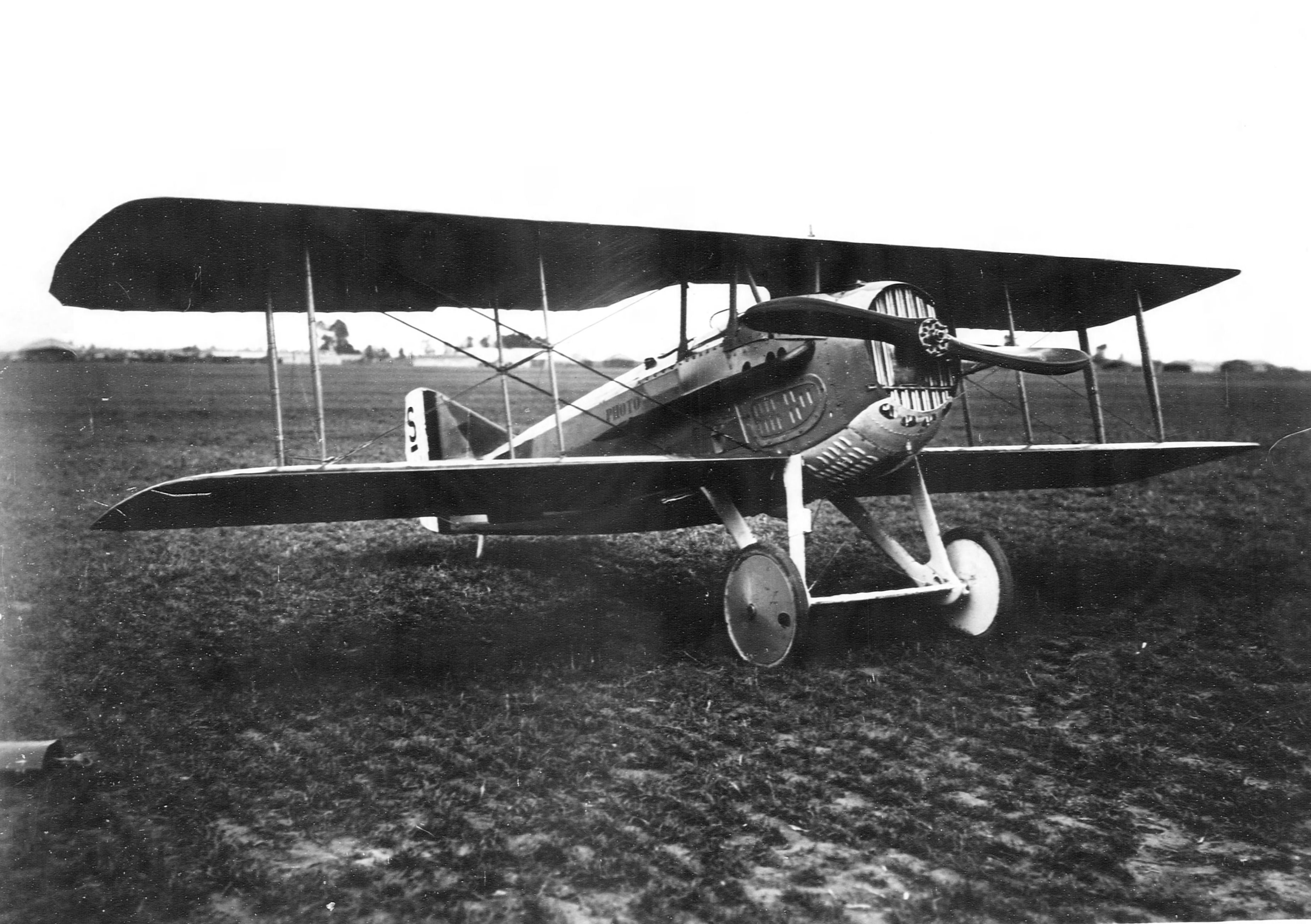
The SPAD S.X13 fighter was the squadron's final sircraft for the war.

- Caudron R.IVs
- Nieuport fighters: c. 8 September 1916 - late 1917
- SPAD S.VII and SPAD S.XIII fighters: Late 1917 - war's end
