= Latécoère 611 =

Prototype French navy flying boat

General information
- Type: Flying Boat
- Manufacturer: Latécoère
- Primary user: French Navy
- Number built: 1

History
- Introduction date: 1940
- First flight: 8 March 1939
- Retired: 1947

The Latécoère 611 was a French four-engined maritime reconnaissance flying boat of the Second World War. Although only a single prototype was completed, this served throughout the war, being used by both the Vichy French and Free French navies.

== Development and design ==
In May 1935, the French Navy issued a specification for a long-range flying boat to replace the obsolete Breguet 521. To meet this requirement, Latécoère designed the Latécoère 611. This was a cantilever monoplane powered by four Gnome-Rhone 14N radial engines and fitted with a twin tail. It was also fitted with stabilising floats that retracted into the outer engine nacelles. The prototype was assembled at Biscarrosse, and first flew on 8 March 1939.

Although it was intended that the aircraft be armed with two forward-firing 13.2 mm Hotchkiss machine guns forward-mounted in the center of the wing, a 25 mm Hotchkiss cannon in a dorsal turret with a further four machine guns firing through portholes two in a retractable tail position.

However, the Hotchkiss guns proved to be unreliable, so instead, the forward firing gun was replaced by a 7.5 mm Darne machine gun, with the dorsal turret carrying two of these guns.

In December 1939 the French Navy placed an order for twelve of a modified version, the Latécoère 612, which was to be powered by four Pratt & Whitney R-1830 radial engines. These aircraft, however, were never delivered.

== Operational history ==
The prototype Latécoère 611 was delivered to the French Navy on 12 April 1940 and named Achenar, being flown to North Africa in June 1940 and subsequently disarmed under the terms of the Armistice. After being damaged in a collision with another flying boat, it eventually entered full service with the Vichy French Navy on 15 October 1941, operating with Escadrille 4E at Port Lyautey and Dakar.

In November 1942, following the Allied Invasion of North Africa, Escadrille 4E switched sides and joined the Free French, carrying out anti-submarine patrols over the South Atlantic, later (October 1943) being enlarged to form Flotille 7F, which continued to fly the Latécoère 611 alongside Short Sunderlands. The Latécoère was re-armed in 1944, with the dorsal turret being fitted with two 50 cal. Browning machine guns and a similar gun being fitted in the tail.

The sole Latécoère 611 was finally retired from service as a transport in 1947.

== Variants ==
Latécoère 610
Design studies for a military flying boat to have been powered by 4x 1,000 hp (750 kW) Hispano-Suiza 14AA-02 / Hispano-Suiza 14AA-03 engines, (left and right handed rotation).
Latécoère 611
Prototype – powered by four Gnome-Rhône 14N-30 / Gnome-Rhône 14N-31 engines, (left and right handed rotation), given the name Achernar. One built.
Latécoère 612
Proposed production version – powered by four Pratt & Whitney R-1830 engines, (twelve ordered but unbuilt).

== Specifications (Latécoère 611) ==
Data from Warplanes of the Second World War, Volume Five, Flying Boats

General characteristics

- Crew: 7
- Length: 27.06 m (88 ft 9 in)
- Wingspan: 40.56 m (133 ft 1 in)
- Height: 7.65 m (25 ft 1 in)
- Wing area: 195.1 m^{2} (2,100 sq ft)
- Empty weight: 16,034 kg (35,349 lb)
- Gross weight: 26,555 kg (58,544 lb)
- Max takeoff weight: 31,065 kg (68,487 lb)
- Powerplant: 4 × Gnome-Rhône 14N-30/31 14 cyl. air-cooled radial engine, 735 kW (986 hp) each

Performance

- Maximum speed: 349 km/h (217 mph, 188 kn)
- Cruise speed: 180 km/h (110 mph, 97 kn)
- Range: 4,250 km (2,640 mi, 2,290 nmi)
- Endurance: 32 hours
- Time to altitude: 2,000 m (6,600 ft) in 10 minutes

Armament

- Guns:
  - Original configuration:
    - 2 × 13.2 mm (0.52 in) Hotchkiss machine guns forward-mounted in the center of the wing
    - 1 × 25 mm (0.98 in) CA mle 39 cannon in a dorsal turret
    - 2 × 7.5 mm (0.30 in) Darne machine guns in a tail position
    - 4 × 7.5 mm (0.30 in) Darne machine guns in beam positions
  - 1944 configuration:
    - 2 × 12.7 mm (0.50 in) M2 Browning machine guns in a dorsal turret
    - 1 × 12.7 mm (0.50 in) M2 Browning machine gun in a tail position
    - 4 × 7.5 mm (0.30 in) Darne machine guns in beam positions
- Bombs: 802 kg (1,768 lb) (up to 7,000 kg (15,000 lb)) of bombs, depth charges or torpedoes

== Operators ==
France

- French Navy

Vichy France

- Vichy French Air Force

Free France

- Free French Air Force

== See also ==
Aircraft of comparable role, configuration, and era

- Blohm & Voss BV 222
- Kawanishi H8K
- Lioré et Olivier LeO H-246
- Martin PBM Mariner
- Potez-CAMS 141
- Short Sunderland

Related lists

- List of aircraft of the French Air Force during World War II
- List of aircraft of World War II
- List of flying boats and floatplanes

== Bibliography ==
- Bousquet, Gérard (2013). French Flying Boats of WW II. Sandomierz, Poland: Stratus. ISBN 978-83-63678-06-7.
- Green, William (1968). Warplanes of the Second World War, Volume Five, Flying Boats. London: Macdonald. pp. 27–29. ISBN 0-356-01449-5.
