= Latécoère 582 =

1930s French long-range patrol flying-boat

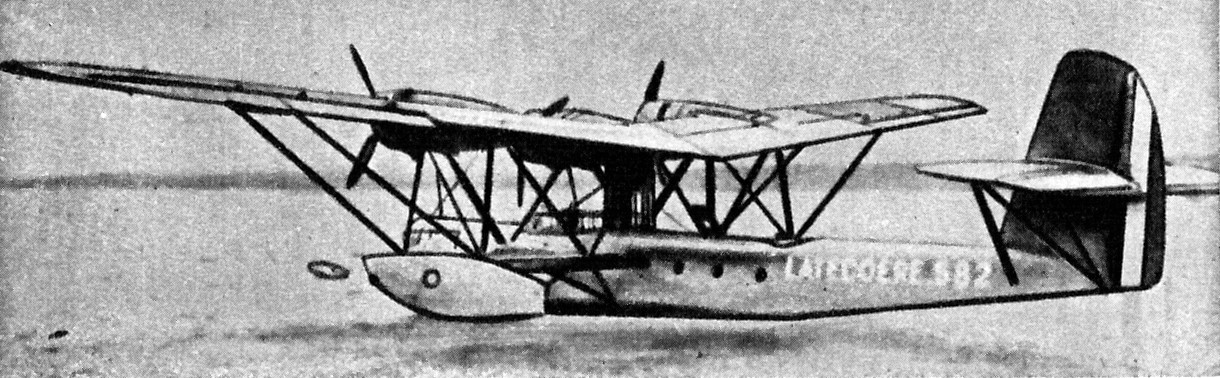

General information
- Type: long-range patrol flying-boat
- National origin: France
- Manufacturer: Latécoère
- Number built: 1

History
- First flight: 25 July 1935

The Latécoère 582 was a 1930s French long-range patrol flying-boat designed and built by Latécoère for the French Navy. First flown on 25 July 1935 the 583 was a parasol-wing monoplane flying-boat. Powered by three 890 hp (663 kW) Gnome-Rhône 14Kirs radial piston engines. The French Navy choose to buy the Breguet Bizerte and the one Latécoère 582 ended up as a flying test bed at Saint-Raphaël.

== Specifications ==
Data from

General characteristics

- Wingspan: 28.00 m (91 ft 10 in)
- Max takeoff weight: 11,600 kg (25,574 lb)
- Powerplant: 3 × Gnome-Rhône 14Kirs radial piston engine, 660 kW (890 hp) each

Performance

- Maximum speed: 280 km/h (170 mph, 150 kn)

== See also ==
Related lists

- List of flying boats and floatplanes
