= Heinkel He 59 =

1931 military floatplane family by Heinkel

He 59
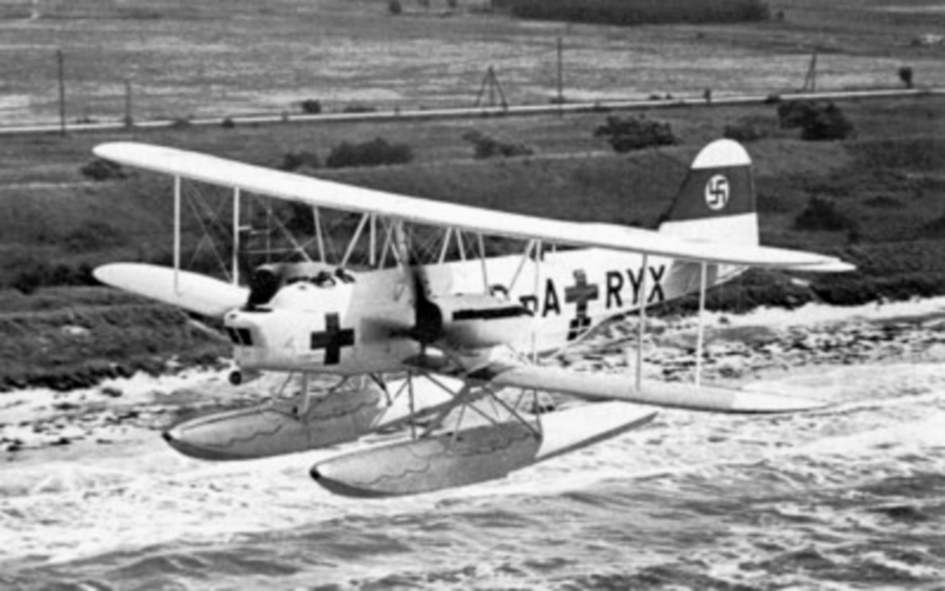
- The prototype He 59B-3 search-and-rescue aircraft in flight.

General information
- Type: Trainer, transport, air ambulance, torpedo bomber
- Manufacturer: Heinkel
- Primary users: Luftwaffe Finnish Air Force
- Number built: 142

History
- Introduction date: 1935
- First flight: September 1931
- Retired: 1944

The Heinkel He 59 was a twin-engined German biplane designed in 1930, resulting from a requirement for a torpedo bomber and reconnaissance aircraft able to operate on wheeled landing gear or twin-floats.

== Development ==
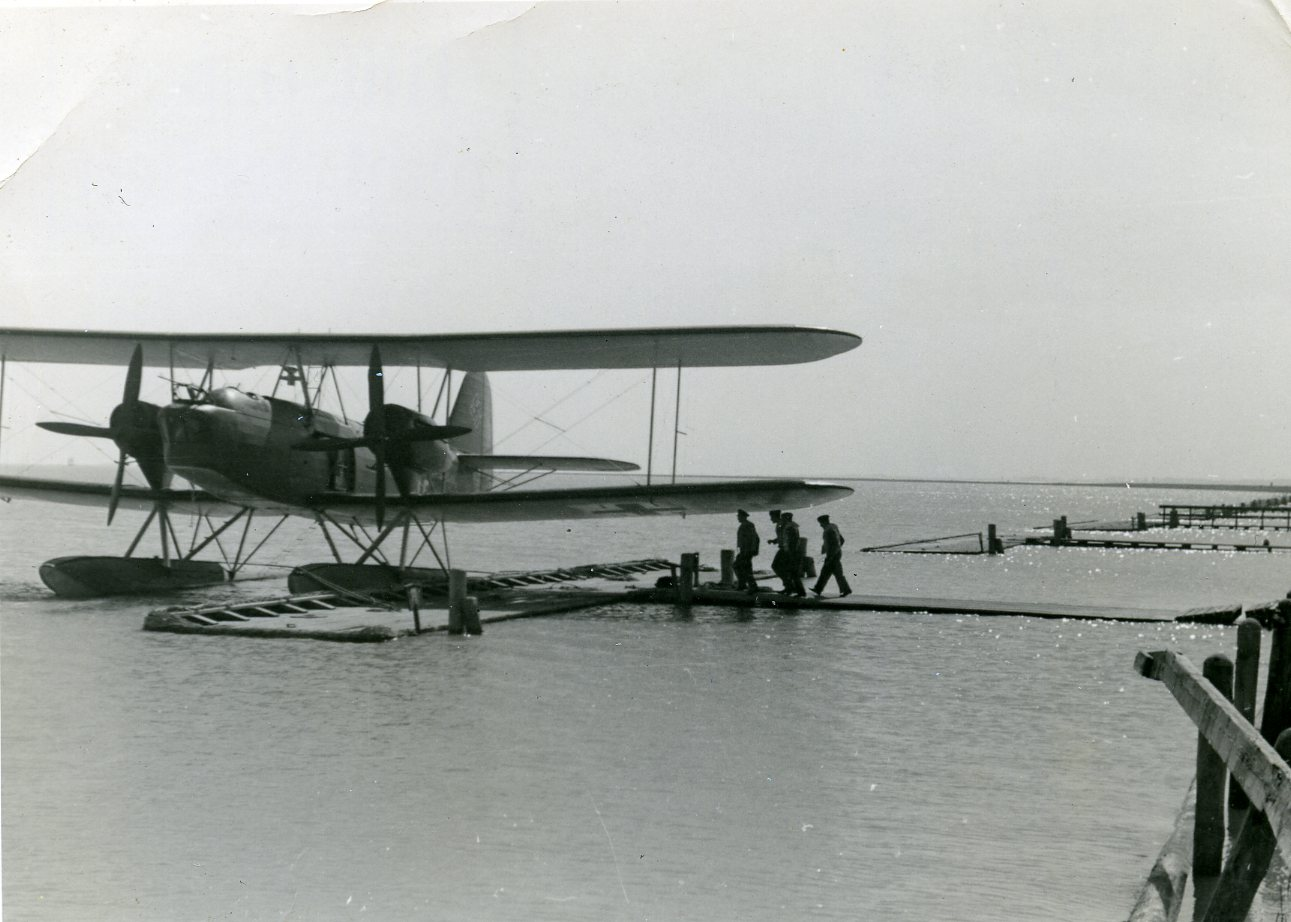
crew of the 6. Seenotstaffel is walking from the Zeeburgereiland over the jetty to their Heinkel He 59. Probably in the second half of 1940 or 1941.

In 1930, Ernst Heinkel began developing an aircraft for the Reichsmarine. To conceal the true military intentions, the aircraft was officially a civil aircraft. The He 59B landplane prototype was the first to fly, an event that took place in September 1931, but it was the He 59A floatplane prototype that paved the way for the He 59B initial production model, of which 142 were delivered in three variants. The Heinkel He 59 was a pleasant aircraft to fly; deficiencies noted were weak engines, limited range, small load capability, and insufficient armament.

== Design ==
The aircraft was of a mixed-material construction. The wings were made of a two-beam wooden frame, where the front was covered with plywood and the rest of the wing was covered with fabric. The box-shaped fuselage had a fabric-covered steel frame. The tail section was covered with lightweight metal sheets.

The keels of the floats were used as fuel tanks - each one holding 900 L (240 US gal; 200 imp gal) of fuel. Together with the internal fuel tank, the aircraft could hold a total of 2,700 L (710 US gal; 590 imp gal) of fuel. Two fuel tanks could also be placed in the bomb bay, bringing the total fuel capacity up to 3,200 L (850 US gal; 700 imp gal). The propellers were fixed-pitch with four blades.

== Operations ==
During the first months of World War II, the He 59 was used as a torpedo- and minelaying aircraft. It was also serving with various Seenotstaffeln (Air Sea Rescue). It also helped land troops in Norway and Holland in the Spring of 1940. Between 1940 and 1941 the aircraft was used by four KüFlGr (Küstenfliegergruppe/Coastal reconnaissance group), and in 1941-42 as a transport, air-sea rescue, and training aircraft. Some had been operated by the Condor Legion in Spain during the Spanish Civil War in 1936 as coastal reconnaissance and torpedo floatplanes.

During the Battle of Britain, they were used to rescue German aircrew who had ditched in The Channel. The British claimed that because the air-sea rescue aircraft were being used for reconnaissance, they were legitimate targets despite carrying Red Cross markings. Even before then some had been forced down by British aircraft.

Most of the 140 B-2s and B-3s built by Arado were later converted by the Walter Bachmann Flugzeugbau for air/sea rescue (He 59C-2 and D-1) or specialised training in navigation (He 59C-1, D-1 and N), torpedo dropping (E-1) and photographic roles (E-2). All of these aircraft were unarmed except for the He 59N.

The Ilmavoimat (Finnish Air Force) rented four aircraft from Germany in August 1943. These were used to ferry long-range reconnaissance patrols behind enemy lines. They were returned to Germany four months later.

== Operators ==
Finland

- Finnish Air Force

Germany

- Luftwaffe

Spain

- Spanish Air Force

== Variants ==
- He 59a : first prototype.
- He 59b : second prototype.
- He 59A : test and evaluation aircraft. 14 built.
- He 59B-1 : 16 pre-production aircraft.
- He 59B-2 : improved version.
- He 59B-3 : reconnaissance aircraft.
- He 59C-1 : unarmed trainer
- He 59C-2 : air-sea rescue model
- He 59D-1 : combined trainer and air-sea rescue model
- He 59E-1 : torpedo bomber trainer
- He 59E-2 : photographic aircraft
- He 59N : armed navigation trainer

== Specifications (He 59B-2) ==
Data from Warplanes of the Third Reich

General characteristics

- Crew: 4
- Length: 17.4 m (57 ft 1 in)
- Wingspan: 23.7 m (77 ft 9 in)
- Height: 7.1 m (23 ft 4 in)
- Wing area: 153.2 m^{2} (1,649 sq ft)
- Empty weight: 5,010 kg (11,045 lb)
- Gross weight: 9,119 kg (20,104 lb)
- Powerplant: 2 × BMW VI 6.0 zu (Note: In the designation 6 indicates a compression ratio 6:1, z - Zenith carburetor, u - propeller reduction gear) V-12 liquid-cooled piston engines, 492 kW (660 hp) each
- Propellers: 4-bladed fixed-pitch propellers

Performance

- Maximum speed: 221 km/h (137 mph, 119 kn)185
- Range: 942 km (585 mi, 509 nmi)
- Ferry range: 1,530 km (950 mi, 830 nmi) with auxiliary tanks
- Service ceiling: 3,500 m (11,500 ft)
- Time to altitude:

1,000 m (3,300 ft) in 4 minutes 42 seconds
2,000 m (6,600 ft) in 11 minutes 12 seconds

Armament

- Guns: 3 × 7.92 mm (.312 in) MG 15 machine guns in nose, dorsal and ventral positions
- Bombs: ** 2 × 500 kg (1,100 lb)
  - 4 × 250 kg (551 lb)
  - 20 × 50 kg (110 lb) bombs
  - 1 × 800 kg (1,764 lb) torpedo

== See also ==
- Action in the North Atlantic US 1943 war film, includes an episode in which two He 59s attack a freighter

Aircraft of comparable role, configuration, and era

- Supermarine Sea Otter

Related lists

- List of aircraft of World War II
- List of military aircraft of Germany
- List of World War II military aircraft of Germany
