= Rescue swimmer =

Military occupation

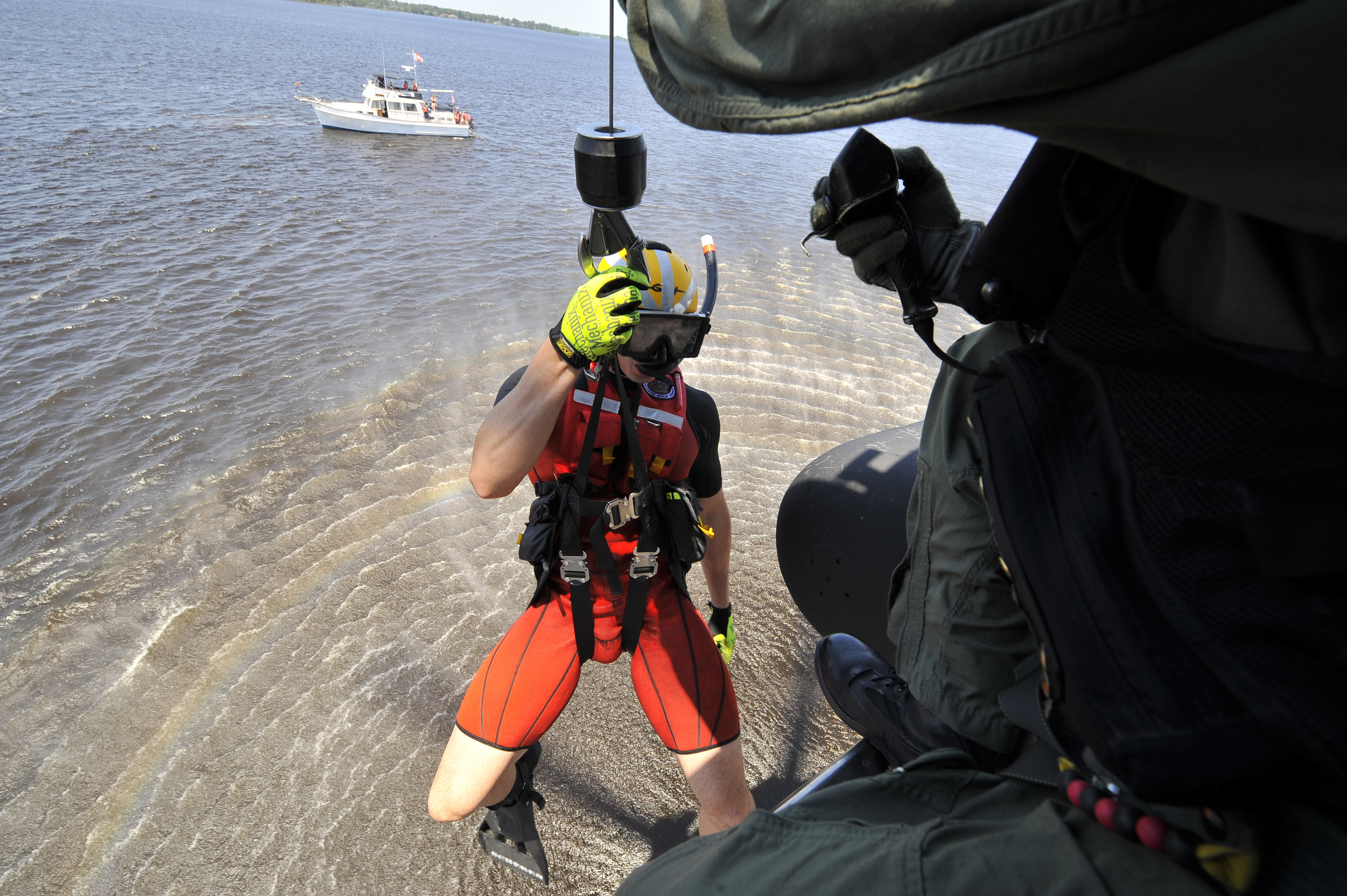
U.S. Coast Guard helicopter rescue swimmer

Rescue swimmer is a qualification given to rescue specialists, most commonly in the service of the military. Rescue swimmers usually are charged with the rescue, assessment, and rendering of medical aid to persons in distress in the sea, on the land, or in the air. This highly specialized position is extremely challenging.

== United States ==
=== U.S. Coast Guard ===
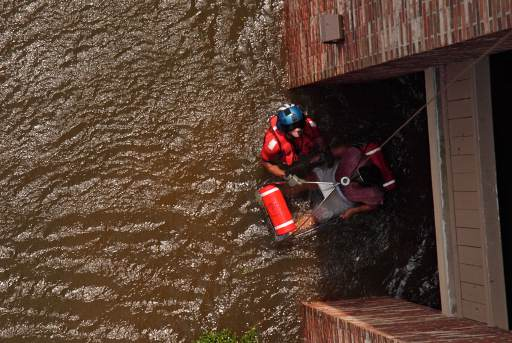
A USCG petty officer pulls a pregnant woman from her flooded New Orleans home.

Arguably the most widely recognized team of rescue-swimmer operators, the United States Coast Guard Aviation Survival Technician (AST)/Helicopter Rescue Swimmer team is trained to respond in extreme rescue situations, such as medical evacuations, downed aviators, sinking vessels, and hurricanes. The Coast Guard's team of ASTs is composed of about 350 active-duty members, and just over 1000 members have passed the training to become Helicopter Rescue Swimmers since the mid-1980s. The training school has one of the highest attrition rates of any military school with about 80% of candidates failing to complete the program. For comparison, the attrition rate for United States Navy SEAL selection and training is about 75%.

AST School in Elizabeth City, North Carolina lasts for 24 weeks, and includes intense physical fitness, long hours of pool fitness and instruction, extreme water-confidence drills, and classroom instruction. The Coast Guard rescue swimmer training program is very challenging and is one of the toughest U.S. military training courses. Reportedly, only 75–100 Coast Guard personnel attend the school each year. The attrition rate in some years has been as high as 85%, although the 10-year average is just over 73%. Prospective U.S. Coast Guard rescue swimmers are physically conditioned to meet high physical fitness standards. About half of prospective candidates make it to AST "A" School. Upon graduation, candidates must attend seven weeks of training at the Coast Guard's Emergency Medical Technician (EMT) school in Petaluma, California, where ASTs become EMT qualified. Rescue swimmers at Coast Guard Air Station Sitka, Alaska, must maintain the EMT-Intermediate level of proficiency due to the remoteness of their operational area and the number of medical evacuations performed by that unit each year. Once stationed at a Coast Guard Air Station, apprentice ASTs must complete 6 months of qualification on their respective airframe before moving on to finish their rescue swimmer syllabus and becoming journeymen.

The Coast Guard holds a one-week Advanced Helicopter Rescue School (AHRS, formerly known as Advanced Rescue Swimmer School) at Coast Guard Station Cape Disappointment, Washington, which is host to Air Force pararescuemen (PJs), Navy rescue swimmers, and foreign rescue departments as well. There, students learn the challenges of vertical-surface rescue, cliff operations, sea-cave traversing, and extreme-high-seas rescue. AHRS is considered the premier helicopter-rescue training school of its kind by most military and civilian rescue operators.

The Coast Guard also trains a basic form of life-saving swimmers known as Cutter Surface Swimmers. These swimmers deploy only from ships and boats, and are tethered to a line handler stationed on board the vessel.

Female rescue swimmers

Women must meet the same physical, endurance, and performance standards as men in order to earn a qualification as a Coast Guard rescue swimmer.

The first female Coast Guard rescue swimmer was Kelly Mogk Larson, who joined the Coast Guard in 1984 and later became the first woman to complete Navy Rescue Swimmer School, on May 23, 1986. In May 2013, Karen Voorhees was the first woman to be advanced to chief petty officer in the rating of aviation survival technician since women were integrated into Coast Guard active duty service in 1973.

The first woman to graduate from the Coast Guard Helicopter Rescue School was Sara Faulkner. During Hurricane Katrina, Faulkner rescued 48 people during one 12-hour shift, along with many others during rescue operations on subsequent shifts. She was nominated by the International Maritime Organization for its “Exceptional Bravery at Sea” award for rescuing three people from a sailboat during a storm with 45-knot winds and 15-foot seas.

=== U.S. Navy ===
Aviation Rescue Swimmer

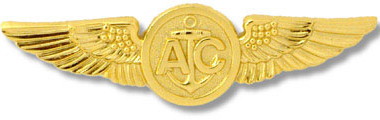
Naval Aircrew Warfare Specialist Badge (NAWS)

The U.S. Navy was the first branch to train aircrew for the specific purpose of being deployed via helicopters into the water to assist survivors to be hoisted into a helicopter. The program was started in the 1970s, approximately 15 years before the U.S. Coast Guard began their rescue swimmer program. In the 70s, Navy rescue swimmers were initially trained in First aid, Survival, Evasion, Resistance and Escape (SERE), Jungle environmental survival training (JEST), Search and rescue (SAR), Combat search and rescue (CSAR). They were initially rated into an aviation related occupation like aviation anti-submarine warfare operator (AW) or mechanic (AD, AE), all of which required successful completion of a 6 week aircrew candidate school. The program has evolved since the 70s and is now part of the Naval Special Operations career field along with Navy SEALs, SWCC, EOD, SARC and Navy Diver.

Vetting Process

Before joining the United States Navy to become an Aviation Rescue Swimmer, you must first pass certain physical and mental tests.

To qualify for Rescue Swimmer Training, both men and women must:

- Meet specific eyesight requirements: uncorrected vision no worse than 20/100; correctable to 20/20 in both eyes with normal depth and color perception
- Meet the minimum Armed Services Vocational Aptitude Battery (ASVAB) score: VE+AR+MK+MC=210 or VE+AR+MK+AS=210
- Pass a PST in DEP/Boot Camp
- Pass Class 1 Flight Physical
- Be 30 years of age or younger
- Must be a U.S. citizen and eligible for security clearance

Physical Screening Test (PST) Requirements -

- Swim 500 yards in 12 minutes or less
- Rest 10 minutes
- Perform at least 42 push-ups in 2 minutes
- Rest 2 minutes
- Perform at least 50 sit-ups in 2 minutes
- Rest 2 minutes
- Perform at least 4 pull-ups in 2 minutes
- Rest 10 minutes
- Run 1.5 miles in 12 minutes or less

Elevated Physical Screening Test (EPST) Requirements -

- Swim 500 yards in 10 minutes or less
- Rest 10 minutes
- Perform at least 65 push-ups in 2 minutes
- Rest 2 minutes
- Perform at least 65 sit-ups in 2 minutes
- Rest 2 minutes
- Perform at least 10 pull-ups in 2 minutes
- Rest 10 minutes
- Run 1.5 miles in 10:15

If you achieve the Elevated Physical Screening Test you are eligible to apply for the enlistment bonus for shipping.

While in the Navy

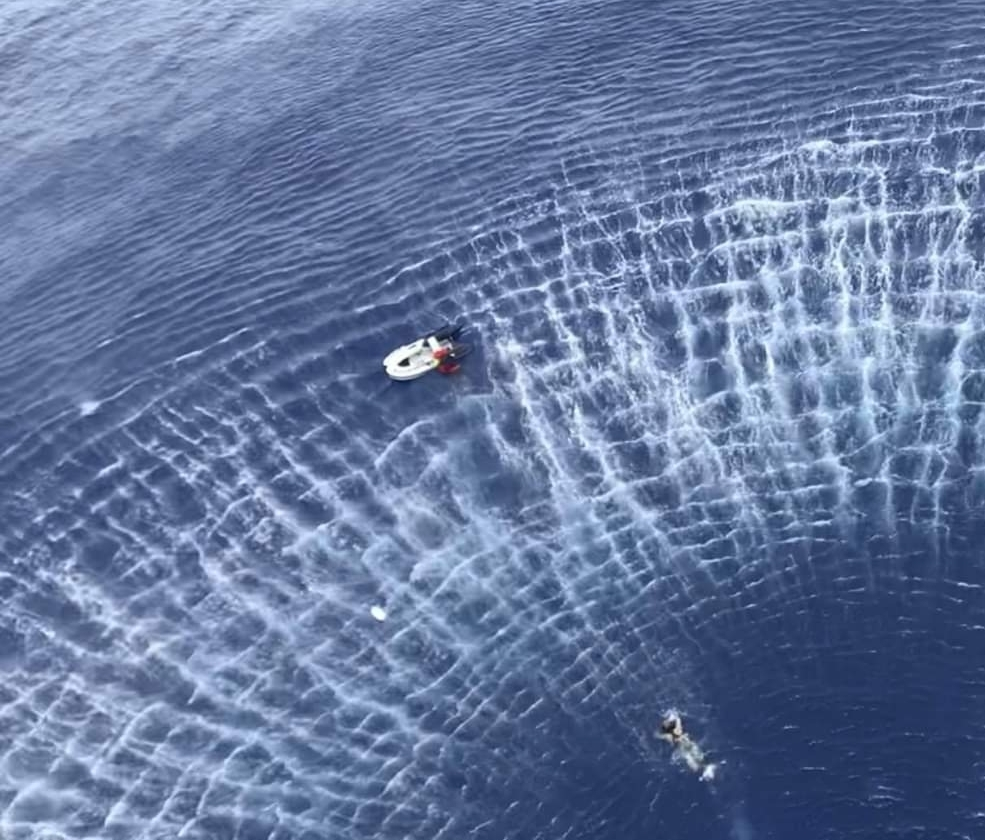
A U.S. Navy sailor swims toward a stranded boat near Guam in 2019

United States Navy rescue swimmer candidates attend a four-week Aircrew School followed by the six-week-long Aviation Rescue Swimmer School (RSS) in Pensacola, Florida. After graduating from Rescue swimmer school (RSS), students go on to their respective 'A' School, also in Pensacola, Florida. Navy air rescue swimmers were recently split into two separate ratings; Naval Aircrewman Helicopter (AWS) and Naval Aircrewman Tactical Helicopter (AWR). Which rating a rescue swimmer attains depends on what type of helicopter they are to become qualified in. AWS will associate with MH-60S and AWR will associate with MH-60R. They are also known as "Romeos" and "Sierras" in their community. Until 'A' School, the training has been identical. Romeos and Sierras break apart during 'A' school and they begin to learn more specific parts of their jobs. Romeos also go through a longer 'A' school than Sierras.

Once Navy rescue swimmers have graduated 'A' School, they will go on to their respective Fleet Replacement Squadron (FRS). There are two FRS's for AWS's. HSC-2 located in Norfolk, VA or HSC-3 located in San Diego, CA. Here crewman learn the various systems in the helicopter in which they will be flying. They are also expected to know various in-flight procedures, such as hoist-operating procedures and in-flight trouble-shooting. This syllabus can take from six to twelve months. Once they are NATOPS certified, and completed with the PQS and boards, they are eligible to wear Naval Aircrew wings.

The last stop for a Navy rescue swimmer is SERE School (Survival, Evasion, Resistance, and Escape). Upon graduation from the brutal two-week course, they will go to the fleet as operational rescue swimmers. They will only be considered qualified Aircrewmen once they complete an additional 18-month 'Utility" PQS in their new squadron. Although, to be considered "fully qualified", they will have to complete the Level II & III syllabus which can take another demanding 24 months.

After arriving to their respective squadrons, Aviation Rescue Swimmers are required annually to perform a SAR fitness test.

SAR test:

- 4 pull-ups (minimum)
- 20 pull-ups (maximum)
- 50 yard 50-pound dumbbell carry with 2 1-foot obstacle
- 1 mile litter walk in 16 minutes or less.
- 500-meter full gear swim, followed by a 400-meter buddy tow in 26 minutes or less

Although an aviation Rescue Swimmer's primary job is to search for and recover downed pilots, there is a multitude of training for tactics. This is what makes a Rescue Swimmer a part of the Special Operations force of the United States Navy. The Level II and III syllabi that a Rescue Swimmer must complete involve training on specific missions such as Helicopter- Visit, board, search, and seizure (HVBSS), Combat search and rescue (CSAR), Special forces support, Close air support, Direct action, Aircrew survival equipmentman, and Surface warfare. All fully qualified AWS crewmen are also aerial/aviation gunners. They qualify on the M240D, GAU-21, M4 carbine(series), and M11 rifle. Each crewman must be a master of their weapons and be able to perform under pressure in order to complete their respective missions. AWS crewmen work with forces such as US Navy SEALs, US Army Rangers, Explosive ordnance disposal (United States Navy), US Marine Forces Special Operations Command, Maritime Security Response Team, BORTAC as well as other law enforcement, symmetric warfare and special warfare units.

Surface Rescue Swimmer

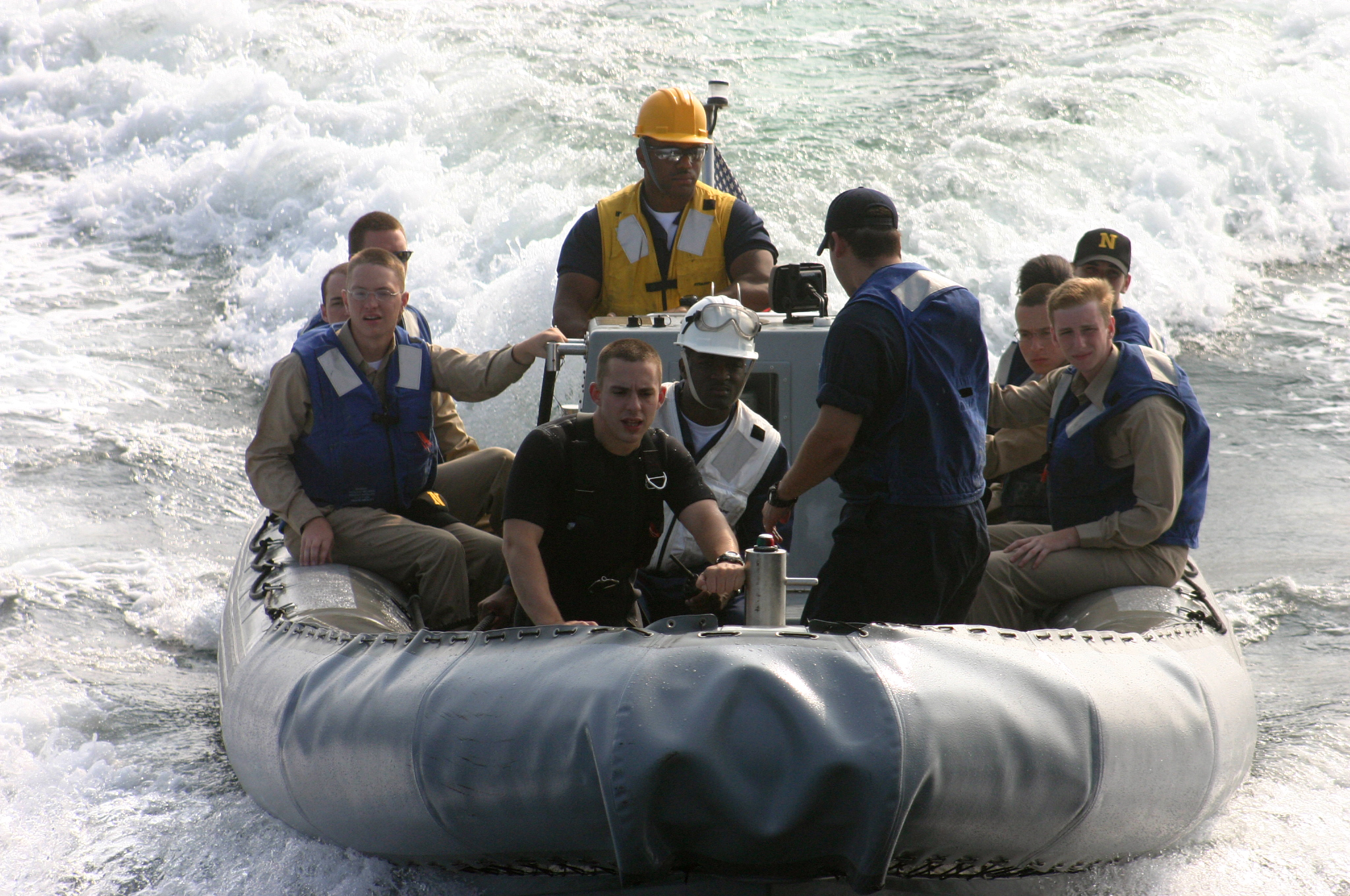
Surface Search and Rescue Swimmer assisting in the transfer of midshipmen

Navy Surface Rescue Swimmers attend a four-week Surface Rescue Swimmer School (SRSS) in Jacksonville, Florida. The school is a similar but simplified version of what US Navy Rescue Swimmers must undergo. To become a Surface Rescue Swimmer you must be able to perform physically.

Minimum Physical Requirements:

- 2 pull-ups in 2 min (2 min break)
- 50 sit-ups in 2 min (2 min break)
- 42 push-ups in 2 min (10 min break)
- 1.5 mile run in 12 min (10 min break)
- 400 meter swim in 11 min (Free style, Side Stroke, or Breast Stroke)

A Surface Rescue Swimmer is typically attached to a United States Naval Vessel and serves as their Search and Rescue asset. The deploy from either the Rigid inflatable boat or the J-Bar in order to conduct a rescue. The primary job of a surface rescue swimmer is whatever they enlisted as. For example, a BM (Boatswain's mate (United States Navy)) can apply to attend Surface Rescue Swimmer School. If they pass, then their collateral duty is to be the Swimmer for their respective vessel.

==== Female rescue swimmers ====
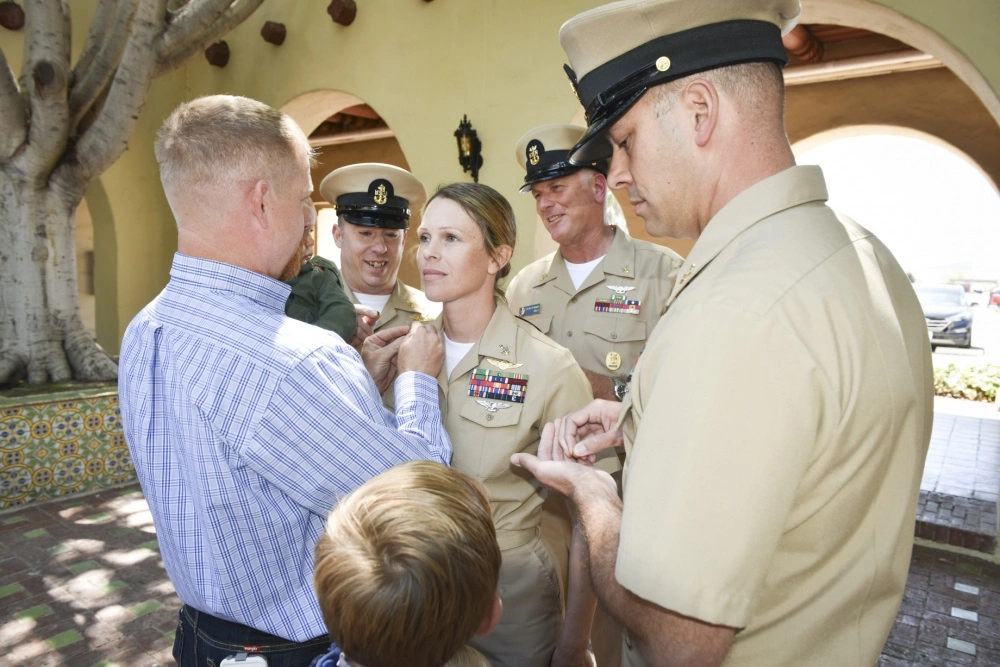
80427-N-ZZ368-002 SAN DIEGO (April. 27, 2018) Family and friends place senior chief anchors on the uniform of Senior Chief Naval Aircrewman Erica Gibson, during a promotion ceremony at Naval Base Coronado, April 27, 2018, Gibson is the first ever female, search and rescue (SAR) swimmer to promote to the rank of senior chief petty officer.

In 1979 Cathy J. Lance was the first female pilot and associated water survival first class swimmer (qualifications completed in 1979) and served as the first Navy ships primary rescue swimmer. Lance had passed the SEAL physical entrance exam as well, however, in 1979 females were not accepted into a combat role.

The first female U.S. Navy rescue swimmer was HMC Catherine Elliott (Rizzo). She was also the first woman to graduate from Helicopter Anti-submarine Squadron in Jacksonville, Florida, and become a rescue swimmer on December 16, 1983. Two women, Kelly Mogk ’86 and Jody Vander Hyden ’89, were graduates and swimmers following the Navy’s course in earlier years. Now the Navy has over 30 female rescue swimmers. As of 2022, Erica Gibson, a 17-year enlisted Sailor, became the first female aviation Navy search and rescue (SAR) swimmer to promote to the rank of senior chief petty officer. Currently assigned to Helicopter Sea Combat Squadron 28, Gibson is the only female senior chief in the Navy and serves HSC-28 as the Leading Chief Petty Officer.

=== U.S. Air Force ===
While the United States Air Force does not have any committed rescue swimmers they do have rescue specialists. These specialists are known as pararescuemen (PJs). PJ's perform sea-based and land-based rescues, although the rescue swimmer portion of their duties is sparsely used.

Pararescue indoctrination is a CSAR (combat search and rescue) training course with an attrition rate of around 80%. This is one of the highest attrition rates of any Special Operations Forces. PJs are a special operations component, engaging in combat search and rescue. They are trained as combatants and paramedics.

During wartime, pararescuemen rescue downed pilots, assist in CSAR for special units as well as other servicemembers. Pararescuemen are also active in peacetime, retrieving NASA space equipment, and also performing rescues in all types of natural disasters, though they get much less recognition for this role due to the small numbers of people rescued. The PJs are often sought out for use by other branches of the military because of their high-quality training and versatility. For example, Air Force pararescuemen can be attached to elite units to provide their expertise for various operations.

== Canada ==
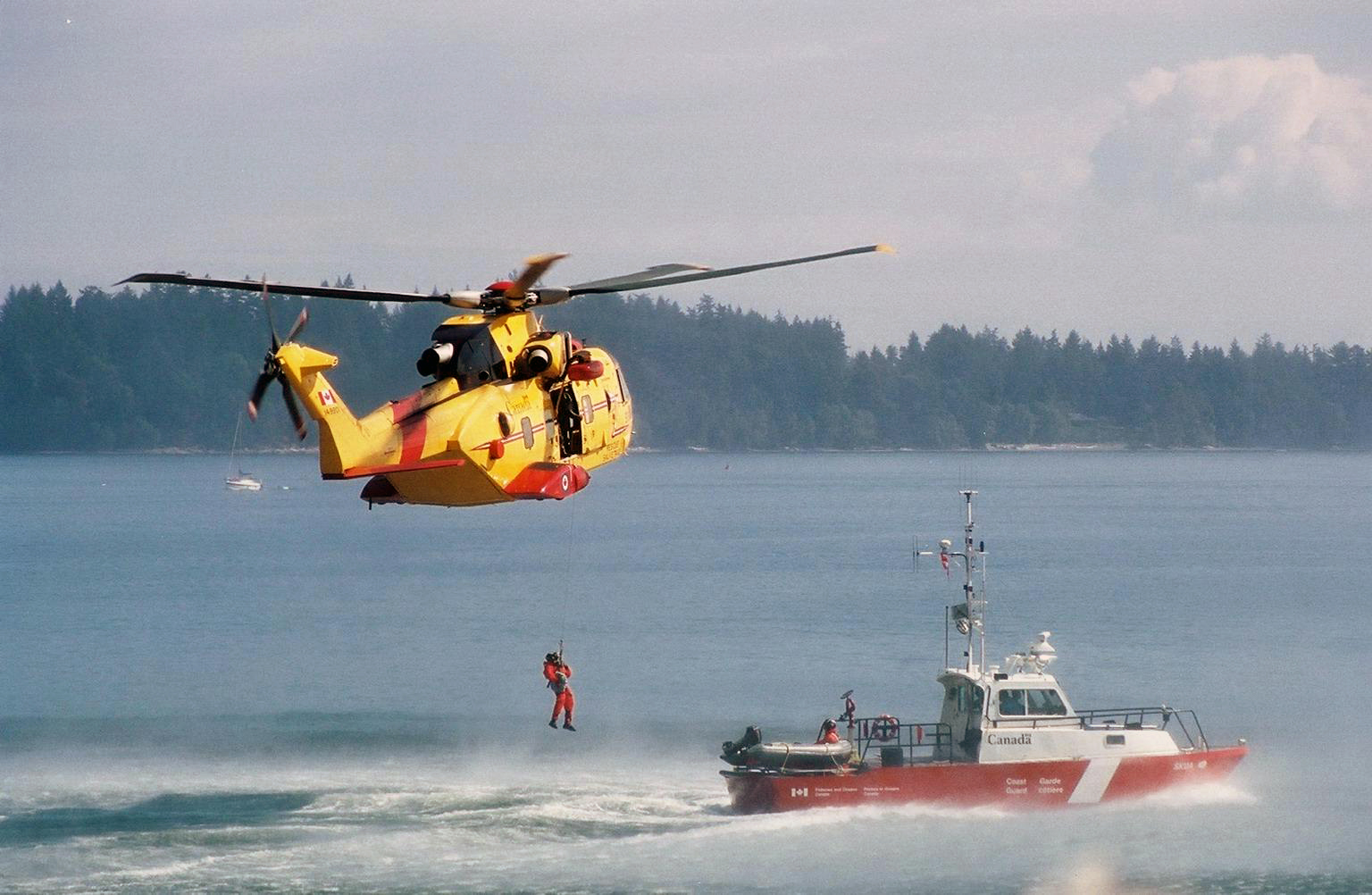
A Canadian Forces CH-149 Cormorant helicopter hoists a man from a Canadian Coast Guard cutter

Royal Canadian Air Force Search and Rescue Technicians (SAR TECHs) serve as rescue swimmers. They are military aircrew who deploy from rotary or fixed-wing aircraft in any environment or climatic condition. They will locate and penetrate the site, then treat and evacuate casualties.

Qualified SAR TECHs have opportunities for advanced training and promotion. SAR TECHs who demonstrate the required knowledge, experience, and leadership skills may also be selected as an instructor at the Canadian Forces School of Search and Rescue (CFSSAR), at 19 Wing Comox, British Columbia.

The Basic SAR TECH course is 11 months in duration. It includes training in arctic operations, survival, parachuting, diving, mountaineering and helicopter operations. SAR Techs are trained to the primary care paramedic (PCP) certification.

There are approximately 140 SAR Techs in the CAF, making it one of the most selective occupations.

== Australia ==
Rescue Crew Officers/Rescue Swimmers (RCO/RS) are employed by Australian helicopter rescue services. The majority of rescue helicopter services within Australia are operated by statutory ambulance services. Most Australian RCOs are qualified Intensive Care Paramedics with several years of on road clinical experience, before completing RCO training as part of induction to a HEMS service. RCOs form part of an aeromedical team, commonly working with a Aeromedical Retrieval Doctor or another Intensive Care Paramedic.

Some services, such as the Westpac Surf Life Saving Helicopter, employ non-clinical Rescue Swimmers. These services perform primary water rescue operations which frequently will be supported by an Ambulance helicopter.

== Denmark ==
Most rescue swimmers in Denmark are Danish Air Force personnel from the Danish Transport and Rescue Squadron (Squadron 722 or in Danish Eskadrille 722), and operate from AgustaWestland EH101 helicopters. These rescue swimmers have to be fully qualified as helicopter technicians before they start a 4-week course at the Danish Frogman Corps, followed by a 2-week first aid/PHTLS course.

Other rescue swimmers are members of the Danish Navy and operate from Westland Lynx Mk 90B helicopters based on Thetis-class ocean patrol vessels in the waters around Greenland, the Faroe Islands, and, occasionally, Iceland. These swimmers are generally recruited from the diver-corps (which has a 6-to-10-week diving course from the Danish Navy Diving School) and receive basic helicopter-crash-survival training.

Some coast-based rescue swimmers with high-speed boats are stationed around the coasts of Denmark. These rescue swimmers are trained by either the Danish national guard or Danish Maritime Safety Administration (Danish: Farvandsvæsnet).

== Japan ==
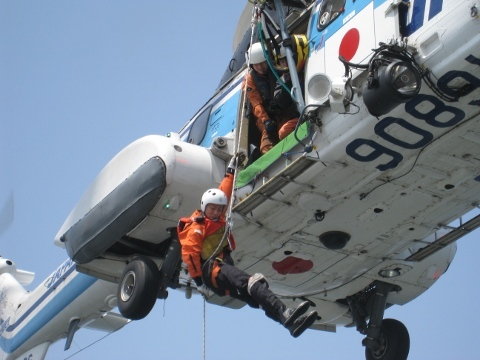
A SRT officer abseiling from an AS332L1 helicopter.

In Japan, air-sea rescue operations are mainly conducted by the Japan Coast Guard (JCG), the Japan Maritime Self-Defense Force (JMSDF) and the Japan Air Self-Defense Force (JASDF).

In the JCG, divers (潜水士, Sensui-shi) have been conducting public safety diving. There are now two additional categories of rescue-swimming specialists: mobile rescue technicians (機動救難士, Kidō-kyūnan-shi) and the top-tier Special Rescue Team (SRT). These are specially trained divers with some advanced techniques including abseiling, and some are also qualified as emergency medical technicians (comparable to Advanced EMT in United States) to provide medical treatments.

In the JMSDF, helicopter rescue swimmers (HRS) are selected from assistant nurses and trained as both aircrew and divers. In contrast, paramedics (救難員, kyūnan-in) of the JASDF, Japanese counterparts of the United States Air Force Pararescue, are not always medical professionals, but they must complete the Airborne Ranger Course of the Japan Ground Self-Defense Force to acquire mountain rescue and combat search and rescue capabilities.

== Rescue swimmers in the media ==
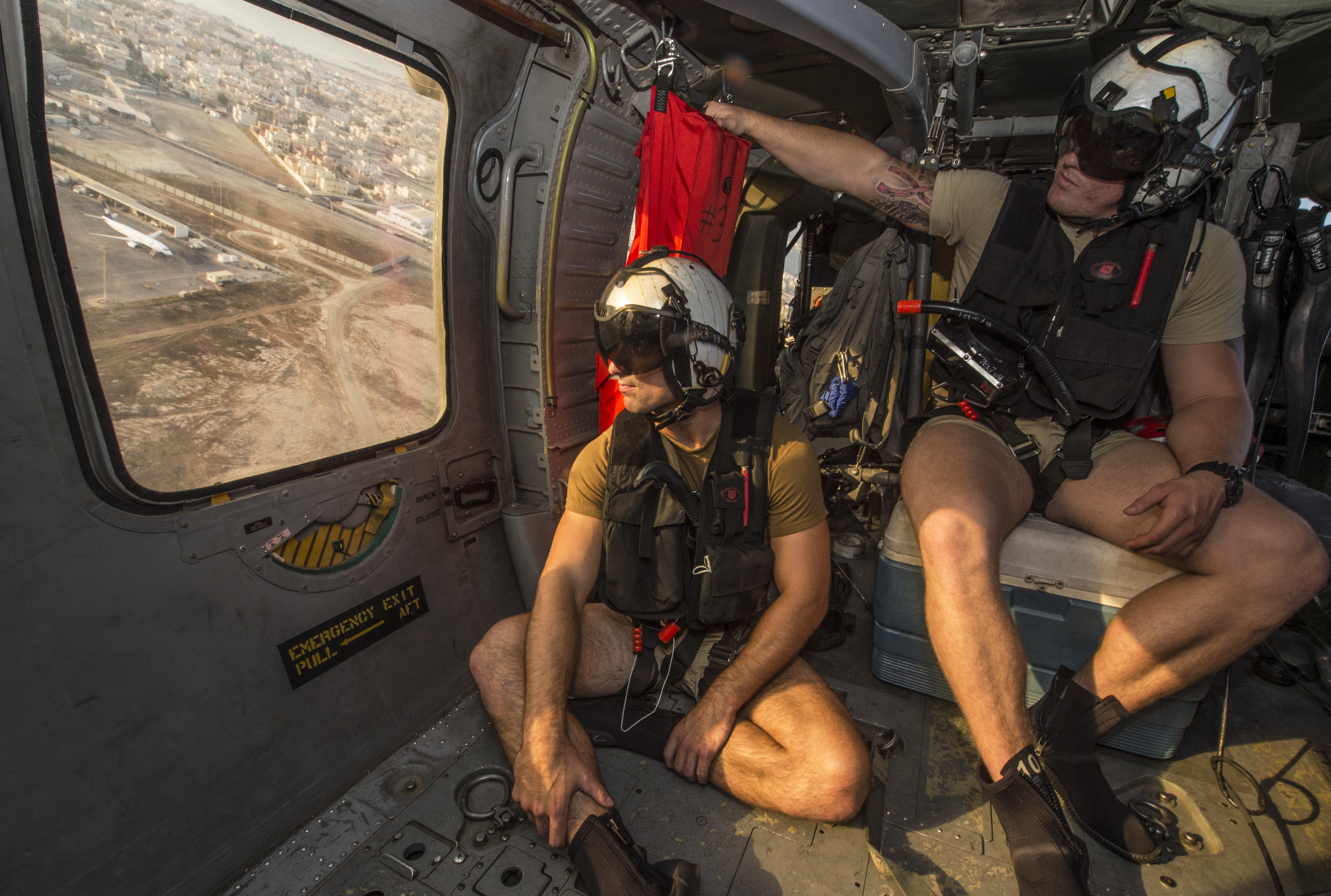
SAR swimmers flying to their training

The release of the 2006 motion picture The Guardian, starring Kevin Costner and Ashton Kutcher, introduced viewers to this small group of elite rescue workers.

A rescue swimmer saves Tom Cruise's character Maverick in Top Gun. The rescue swimmer's name is John Baker, the name of a former Navy SAR School Instructor at NAS North Island in the early 1980s.

The Japanese film series Umizaru depicts the development of the main character, a coast guard officer, as a rescue swimmer. In the anime television series Yomigaeru Sora – Rescue Wings, the main character is a rescue helicopter pilot, but rescue swimmers also appear as regular members in each episode. The actress who played the main character in the live-action film based on the same work, Yuko Takayama, was the orphan of an Air Self-Defense Force medic who was killed in the line of duty.

On the History Channel reality show Top Shot, one of the marksmen is U.S. Navy rescue swimmer Jamie Franks.

U.S. Coast Guard rescue swimmers attracted international attention during the rescue operations following Hurricane Katrina in New Orleans, Louisiana, and surrounding areas. It was reported that in the first five days following Katrina, Coast Guard crews performed more than 33,500 rescue and hoist operations of Katrina victims stranded on rooftops and in flood water. This was reportedly more than the Coast Guard had rescued worldwide in over 50 years. President George W. Bush awarded the active, reserve, auxiliary and civilian employees of the Coast Guard a Presidential Unit Citation and ribbon for their response to Hurricane Katrina.

While Katrina brought domestic and international news coverage to Coast Guard rescue swimmers and their crews, their story was first shown on television in a series of 1999 specials on Discovery Channel, Coast Guard: Rescue Swimmers and Coast Guard: Helicopters to the Rescue. Along with covering the history and the demanding training rescue swimmers must complete, the specials also feature dramatic on-scene footage of several heroic rescues.

The most-viewed rescue swimming event in the media was a marine rescue done by rescue swimmers during the Webtel.mobi Intercontinental Challenge on November 25, 2009. The Webtel.mobi Intercontinental Challenge was the first attempted intercontinental flight between Africa and Europe by man using jetwings, and it was broadcast live worldwide on television. Swiss pilot Yves Rossy, the person who had accepted the Webtel.mobi Intercontinental Challenge, had to ditch into the North Atlantic Ocean midway through the 30-mile flight from Morocco to Spain after his wing was destabilized by a large cumulonimbus cloud. After being located, an emergency marine rescue was undertaken by rescue swimmers live on television, with the Associated Press reporting that more than two billion people had viewed the rescue worldwide on the day of broadcast. The rescue swimmers for this emergency were Stuart Sterzel and Garth Eloff, both former special operators from Special Forces. Stuart Sterzel was also the CEO of Webtel.mobi, the company staging the event. A third standby rescue swimmer was John Brokaar, also a former special operator from Special Forces. The rescue took place in extremely dangerous conditions in the North Atlantic, with the downed pilot being located in less than 15 minutes after his ditched entry into the ocean, in an area where the average time for locating a person in the water is four hours. Once located, he was extracted from the water in a flawless marine rescue. The success of the rescue was credited to the rescue rehearsal carried out on the day before the event, which was also televised worldwide as it happened. The rehearsal took place during a rough-sea state and high winds, and was done to confirm that the rescue swimmers would be able to carry out an effective rescue in the dangerous conditions in the area, which include very strong rip currents, high swells, and cold water temperature in the North Atlantic. On the day of the rehearsal, the rough-sea state and high winds forced Sterzel and Eloff to exit into the North Atlantic Ocean from the skid of a Bell helicopter at a height of over 40 feet, which causes significant water-entry shock on entry. The water-entry shock was reduced only by their succeeding in entering the water at an optimal entry angle despite the high wind and an unstable exit platform. This was attributed to their previous training and experience.

In the aftermath of the July 2025 floods in the Texas Hill Country, over 200 people were rescued from the floods over the course of July 4. Search-and-rescue operations took place on July 4 and overnight from July 4 to 5, resulting in at least 237 people being rescued from floodwaters, including 167 people rescued via helicopter. U.S. Coast Guard rescue swimmer Scott Ruskan was hailed a hero after Department of Homeland Security officials, including Secretary Kristi Noem, credited him with rescuing 165 people.

== See also ==
- Aircrew (Flight crew)

== Bibliography ==
- Martha J. Laguardia-Kotite, Tom Ridge. So Others May Live: Coast Guard Rescue Swimmers Saving Lives, Defying Death. The Lyons Press, 2006, ISBN 978-1-59921-159-6
- Shawn Lansing. The Marine Electric tragedy: So others may live. Coast Guard Compass - Official blog of U.S. Coast Guard, Monday, February 13, 2012.
