= Parachutist Badge (United States) =

U.S. Army award

- Military Parachutist Badge
- Type: Special skill badge
- Awarded for: Completion of airborne training
- Presented by: United States Armed Forces
- Status: Currently awarded
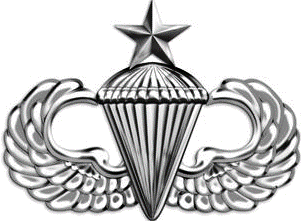
- Other grades of U.S. military parachutist badges Senior Parachutist Badge Master Parachutist Badge Naval Parachutist Insignia

Army Precedence
- Next (higher): Expert Field Medical Badge
- Next (lower): Parachute Rigger Badge

The parachutist badge, also commonly referred to as jump wings, is a military badge of the United States Armed Forces. The military parachutist badge is awarded to all military personnel of any service who complete the US Army Basic Airborne Course at Fort Benning, Georgia. It signifies that the service member is a trained military parachutist, and is qualified to participate in airborne operations. The badge and its sew-on equivalent may be worn on the Army Combat Uniform (ACU).

Some services, such as the Marine Corps, officially refer to it as an insignia instead of a badge. The United States Space Force and United States Coast Guard are the only branches that do not award any parachutist badges, but their members are authorized to receive the parachutist badges of other services in accordance with their prescribed requirements. The DoD military services are all awarded the same military parachutist badge. The U.S. Army and U.S. Air Force issue the same senior and master parachutist badges while the U.S. Navy and U.S. Marine Corps issue the Navy and Marine Corps parachutist insignia to advanced parachutists. The majority of the services earn their military parachutist badge through the U.S. Army Airborne School.

== Army ==
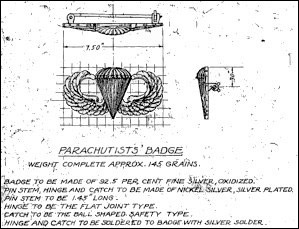
Original sketch for the U.S. Army parachutist badge, by William P. Yarborough (Patent #134963)

The original Army parachutist badge was designed in 1941 by Captain (later Lieutenant General) William P. Yarborough and approved by the Department of War in March of that year. The military parachutist badge replaced the "parachutist patch" which had previously been worn as a large patch on the side of a paratrooper's garrison cap. LTG Yarborough also designed the senior and master parachutist badges and the addition of stars to portray the number of combat jumps. The airborne background trimming that is worn behind the badge of those assigned to airborne units is also a contribution of Yarborough.

The senior and master parachutist badges were authorized in 1949.

=== Military Parachutist Badge ===
To be eligible for award of the Parachutist Badge, a person must have completed the Basic Airborne Course of the Airborne School of the United States Army Infantry School at Fort Benning, Georgia. To graduate, a student must complete the three-phase course consisting of a ground phase, a tower phase, and a jump phase. By the end of the course, a student will have completed five jumps in varying jump configurations, from a "Hollywood" jump all the way to a full combat load jump at night.

=== Senior Parachutist Badge ===
To be eligible for the Senior Parachutist Badge, a person must have been rated excellent in character and efficiency and have met the following requirements:

1. Participated in a minimum of 30 jumps including 15 jumps with combat equipment to consist of normal TOE equipment including individual weapon carried in combat whether the jump was in actual or simulated combat. In cases of simulated combat the equipment will include water, rations (actual or dummy), ammunition (actual or dummy), and other essential items necessary to sustain an individual in combat. Two night jumps must also be made during the hours of darkness (regardless of time of day with respect to sunset) one of which will be as jumpmaster of a stick. In addition, two mass tactical jumps which culminate in an airborne assault problem with either a unit equivalent to a battalion or larger; a separate company battery; or an organic staff of regimental size or larger. The soldier must fill a position commensurate with his or her rank or grade during the problem.
2. Either graduated from the Jumpmaster Course of the Airborne Department of the Infantry School or from the Jumpmaster School of a separate airborne battalion or larger airborne unit, or infantry divisions and separate infantry brigades containing organic airborne elements (e.g. the United States Army Alaska (USARAK) or the United States Army Special Operations Command (USASOC) Jumpmaster Course), or served as jumpmaster on one or more combat jumps or as a jumpmaster on 15 noncombat jumps.
3. Have served on jump status with an airborne unit or other organizations authorized parachutists for a total of at least 24 months.

=== Master Parachutist Badge ===
To be eligible for the Master Parachutist Badge, a person must have been rated excellent in character and efficiency and have met the following requirements:

1. Participated in a minimum of 65 jumps including 25 jumps with combat equipment to consist of normal TOE equipment, including individual weapon carried by the individual in combat whether the jump was in actual or simulated combat. In cases of simulated combat the equipment will include water rations (actual or dummy), ammunition (actual or dummy), and other essential items necessary to sustain an individual in combat. Four night jumps must also be made during the hours of darkness, one as jumpmaster of a stick. Five mass tactical jumps must be made which culminate in an airborne assault problem with a unit equivalent to a battalion or larger; a separate company/battery; or an organic staff of regimental size or larger. The person must fill a position commensurate with their rank or grade during the problem.
2. Either graduated from the Jumpmaster Course of the Airborne Department of the Infantry School or the Jumpmaster School of a separate airborne battalion or larger airborne unit, or infantry divisions and separate infantry brigades containing organic airborne elements, including the U.S. Army Alaska Jumpmaster Course, or served as jumpmaster on one or more combat jumps or as jumpmaster on 33 noncombat jumps.
3. Have served on jump status with an airborne unit or other organization authorized parachutists for a total of 36 months (may be non-consecutive).

The 25 combat equipment jumps necessary to qualify for the Master Parachutist Badge must be from a static line.

The master parachutist badge is 1 1/2 inches (38 mm) wide at the widest part of the wings and 1 13/64 inches (31 mm) from the top of the wreath to the bottom of the parachute where the risers meet in a point.

=== Accoutrements ===
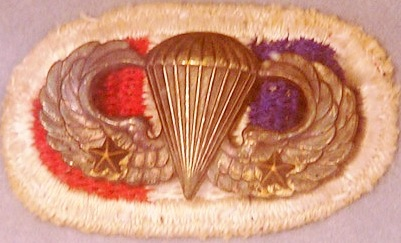
A parachutist badge from a 506th Parachute Infantry veteran—as indicated by the background trimming—who made two combat jumps—as indicated by the two bronze jump devices on the badge.

==== Airborne background trimming ====
The Airborne background trimming was also a contribution of Captain Yarborough, who attempted to address a concern that the parachutist badge did not stand out on the uniform.

Each U.S. Army airborne unit—whether parachute, glider, or air assault—had a unique airborne background trimming designed with their unit's colors. Over time, the design of each parachute and air assault unit's background trimming became complementary to the unit's beret flash that is worn on the U.S. Army maroon, tan, rifle-green, and black berets.

Today, airborne background trimming designs are created and/or authorized by The U.S. Army Institute of Heraldry, which evaluates unit lineage, military heraldry, and proposed designs by the requesting unit before commissioning a design for production.

Soldiers assigned to Army units on airborne status wear their unit's airborne background trimmings behind their parachutist badge which distinguishes a parachute-qualified soldier serving in a unit on active jump status, called a "Paratrooper," from a military parachutist serving in a non-airborne unit.

==== Combat jump device ====
A paratrooper who completes an airborne jump into a combat zone is authorized to wear a combat jump device on their parachutist badge, turning it into a combat parachutist badge. The device consists of a star or arrangements of stars, indicating the number of combat jumps (up to five) conducted by the paratrooper. The use of stars as combat jump devices gained official approval after the 1983 invasion of Grenada (Operation Urgent Fury). The stars are awarded as follows:

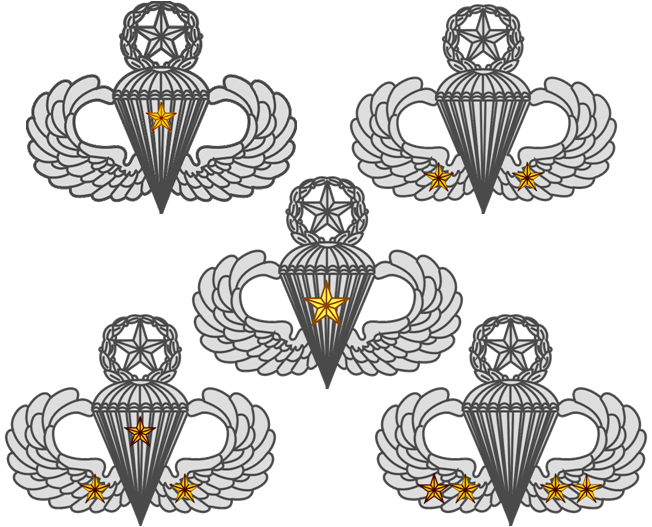

1 combat jump	A bronze star on the shroud lines
2 combat jumps	A bronze star on each wing
3 combat jumps	A bronze star on each wing and one on the shroud lines
4 combat jumps	Two bronze stars on each wing
5 + combat jumps	A large gold star on the shroud lines

== Air Force ==
Like the Army, the Air Force issues the same parachutist badges in the same three degrees (Basic, Senior, & Master) but have different criteria for the awarding of these badges. The level of degree is determined by the number of jumps the wearer has successfully completed, years of service on jump status, and other requirements as specified by AFI 11-402, Aviation and Parachutist Service, Aeronautical Ratings and Badges. Additionally Airmen who have earned the Parachutist Badge while serving as members of a sister branch then transferred to the U.S. Air Force are allowed to continue wear of the badge without having to requalify.

USAF Parachutist Badges from 1956–1963

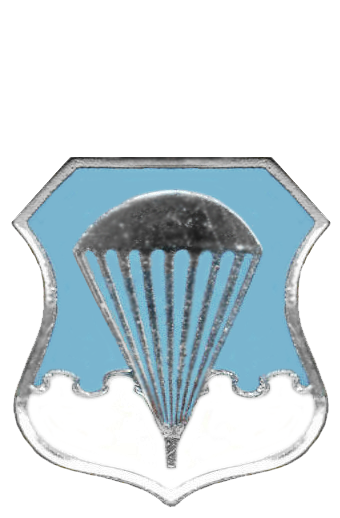
Basic Badge

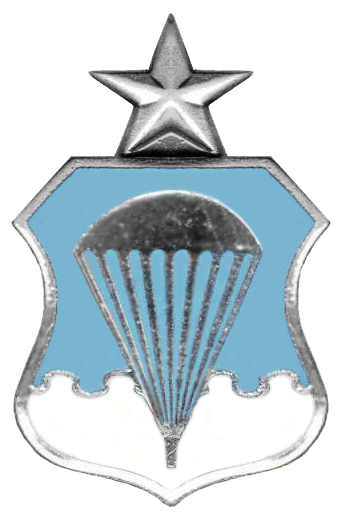
Senior Badge

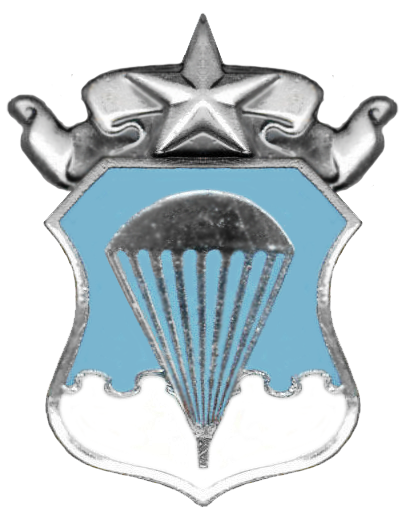
Master Badge

In 1956 the Air Force began issuing a unique basic, senior, and master parachutist badges. These parachutist badges were modeled after the Air Force's Medical Badges. Due to popular demand, the Air Force decided to revert to issuing the Army style parachutist badges in 1963.

=== Basic Parachutist Badge ===
The basic parachutist badge may be awarded following completion of basic parachute training through a designated Air Force Air-Ground Training Program. Air Force personnel generally earn the basic parachutist badge either through the Army's Airborne School at Fort Benning, or the United States Air Force Academy's AM-490 free-fall parachute training course taught by AETC's 98th Flying Training Squadron.

=== Senior Parachutist Badge ===
The senior parachutist badge consists of the basic parachutist badge with a star atop the parachute. Awarded for 30 static line jumps with a minimum of 24 months of cumulative time on jump status. The 30 jumps must include:

1. Two jumps during the hours of darkness
2. Fifteen jumps with operational equipment IAW AFI 11-410
3. Perform one night jump as a Primary JM (PJM)
4. Seven jumps performing as PJM

=== Master Parachutist Badge ===
The master parachutist badge consists of the senior parachutist badge with a wreath around the star. Awarded for 65 static line jumps with a minimum of 36 months of cumulative time on jump status. The 65 jumps must include:

1. Four jumps during the hours of darkness
2. Twenty-five jumps with operational equipment IAW AFI 11-410
3. Two night jumps performing PJM duties
4. Fifteen jumps performing as PJM

== Navy and Marine Corps ==
The United States Navy and Marine Corps issue parachutist insignia in two degrees: the military parachutist badge, the same badge that is awarded to all DoD military services, and the Naval or Navy/Marine Corps parachutist insignia. Parachutist insignia is available to personnel who perform qualifying airborne jumps as a static-line parachute jumper or military free-fall parachute jumper:

Training is accomplished by successful completion of the prescribed course of instruction while attending the:

- U.S. Army Airborne School,
- Military Free-Fall Parachutist Course
- other training certified by Chief of Naval Education and Training (CNET) or approved by the Chief of Naval Operations (CNO).

=== Military Parachutist Insignia ===
The right to wear the military parachutist insignia is based on the completion of prescribed training defined in OPNAVINST 3501.225 and MCO 3120.11: The Marine Corps refers to it as the Basic Parachutist Insignia.

When a US Navy enlisted member initially qualifies as a static line parachutist, an entry shall be made on NAVPERS 1070/613 (commonly referred to as a "Page 13" entry) of the US Navy enlisted service record indicating the date of qualification, type(s) of aircraft in which qualified, and unit at which the training was received. Navy enlisted members are authorized the parachutist (PJ) designator added to their rating.

A qualified static-line parachute jumper who successfully completes the prescribed program of instruction while attending a formal, interservice training facility including a minimum of 10 military free-fall parachute jumps, at least 2 of which must have been conducted carrying full combat equipment (1 day/1 night), may qualify. Navy enlisted members are authorized the military free-fall parachutist (FPJ) designator added to their rating.

When a US Navy officer initially qualifies as a static line parachutist, the additional qualification designator (AQD) of BT1 will be entered into the officer's record by their detailer (NAVPERS). Free-fall qualification will result in an AQD of BT2.

For both static-line and military free-fall parachutist qualified personnel, a service record entry shall also indicate whether or not the member is HALO-qualified.

The military parachutist badge is a prerequisite for the Special Warfare Badge since parachutist training is an integral part of the Navy's Basic Underwater Demolition/SEAL (BUD/S) program. SEAL personnel generally do not wear the Basic badge once they earn their Special Warfare insignia, but will wear their Naval Parachutist Badge in addition to the Special Warfare Badge, the latter nicknamed the "Budweiser" badge. Navy EOD technicians are generally also jump qualified with a number of them also being qualified in military free-fall (HALO/HAHO). Currently, due to a recent change, newly pinned Navy EOD technicians are required to attend the U.S. Army's Basic Airborne School upon graduation. As well, a number of SWCC personnel earn the military parachutist badge in conjunction with their assignment to a Special Boat Team detachment that uses the Maritime Craft Air Delivery System (MCADS). This enables them to drop small watercraft and their crews from C-130 aircraft.

=== Naval Parachutist Insignia ===
The naval or Navy/Marine Corps parachutist insignia (originally issued as U.S. Navy certified parachute rigger wings) is a gold-colored embroidered or metal insignia depicting an open parachute with outstretched wings. It is authorized for officers and enlisted personnel who were awarded the military parachutist insignia and, under competent orders, have completed an additional five static-line jumps, including: a combat equipment day jump, two combat equipment night jumps, and employ at least two types of military aircraft.

The original certified parachute rigger wings was designed by American Insignia Company in 1942 for graduates of the U.S. Navy Parachute Rigger School. During WWII, U.S. Marine Corps paratroopers issued the silver military parachutist badge commonly wore—against regulations—the gold "rigger wings" because the believed it looked better on their uniform. In July 1963, Commander of United States Marine Corps Force Reconnaissance Bruce F. Meyers asked Chief of Naval Operations Admiral George W. Anderson Jr. via Marine Corps Commandant General David M. Shoup to officially make the Navy parachute rigger wings the naval parachutist badge for the Navy and Marine Corps. The request was approved by Anderson on 12 July 1963 in BuPers Notice 1020. Originally, the badge was worn upon graduation from Navy PR school, but since 1963 being a certified parachute rigger, survival equipmentman, and graduate of the U.S. Navy parachute rigger is no longer a requirement to earn the badge. Currently, the naval parachutist insignia only requires the completion of the minimum five additional jumps—after their five jumps at Army Airborne School—in a jump billet, but service members can request to attend Navy Parachute Rigger School for further training and specialized occupational duties such as Special Operations Parachute Rigger (SOPR) who work within Navy SEAL teams and Naval Special Warfare and Explosive Ordnance Disposal (EOD) units throughout the world.

== See also ==
- List of known U.S. combat parachute jumps
- Military Free-Fall Parachutist Badge
- Air Assault Badge
- Glider Badge
- Pathfinder Badge
- Blood wings
- Aircrew survival equipmentman
