= List of known U.S. combat parachute jumps =

This is a list of known parachute jumps into combat zones by troops and units of the United States Army and other components of the United States Department of Defense. Participation in such jumps is recognized by certain Parachutist Badges.

List of known U.S. combat parachute jumps
Date	Unit	Operation	Troopers	Country	Dropzone
8 November 1942	509th Parachute Infantry Battalion (PIB)	Torch	556	Algeria	Tafaraoui airfield, La Senia
15 November 1942	509th PIB	Torch	300–350	Algeria	Youks les Bains
24 December 1942	509th PIB, Headquarters Company Two French paratroopers		32	Tunisia	El Djem
9 July 1943	504th Parachute Infantry Regiment (PIR), 3rd Battalion (jumped first). 505th Regimental Combat Team (RCT), including 505th PIR, 456th Parachute Field Artillery (PFA), 307th Engineering Battalion (Engr.), Company B.	Husky I	3,406	Italy	Gela, Sicily
10 July 1943	504th RCT, including 504th PIR, 1st & 2nd Btn.; 376th PFA, 307th Engr., Co. A	Husky II	2,304	Italy	Gela, Sicily
5 September 1943	503rd PIR	Postern	1,700	New Guinea	Nadzab, Markham Valley
13 September 1943	504th RCT, including 504th PIR, 376th PFA, 307th Engr., Co. A	Avalanche	1,300	Italy	Paestum, Salerno
14 September 1943	505th RCT, including 505th PIR, 456th PFA, 370th Engr., Co. B	Avalanche	2,105	Italy	Salerno, Paestum
14 September 1943	509th PIB	Avalanche	640	Italy	Avellino
6 June 1944	82nd Airborne Division (507, 508) 505th RCT, including 505th PIR, 307th Engr. Co. B, 456th PFA. 28 Pathfinders, 504th PIR, (7 returned).	Overlord, Titanic (Dropping of parachute dummies, "Oscar").	6,418	France	Normandy
6 June 1944	101st Airborne Division [326, 377, 501, 502, 506]	Overlord, Titanic (Dropping of parachute dummies, "Oscar").	6,638	France	Normandy
3 July 1944	503rd PRCT, 1st Bn.	Table Tennis	739	New Guinea	Noemfoor Island
4 July 1944	503rd PRCT, 3rd Bn.	Table Tennis	685	New Guinea	Noemfoor Island
15 August 1944	1st Abn. Task Force (460th PFA, 463rd PFABn.; 509th PIB; 517th PCT; 551st PIB; 596th PCEng. Co.)	Dragoon	5,607	France	Cote d' Azur, Riviera
17 September 1944	82nd Airborne Division (508), 505th RCT, Includes: 505th PIR, 456th PFA, & Co.B, 307th Engr.; 504th RCT, Includes: 504th PIR, 376th PFA, & Co.A, 307 Engr	Market Garden	7,250	Netherlands	Grave & Nijmegen
17 September 1944	101st Airborne Division [501, 502, 506]	Market Garden	6,769	Netherlands	Eindhoven
29 November 1944; 5 December 1944	Co.C, 127th Abn.Eng, Bn. Co.C., 1st Pl.., 187th P/GIR 221st AB. Med. Co.; 457th PFA 11th Abn. Div. Hdqt's Group 511th Pcht. Signal Co. 11th Abn. Div. RECON Pl.	Tabletop	241	Leyte	Manarawat
3 February 1945	511th PIR, 457th FABn.	Shoestring	1,830	Philippines	Tagaytay Ridge
16 February 1945	503rd PRCT, 462nd PFABn; Co. C, 161st Airborne Engr. Btn.	Topside	2,050	Philippines	Corregidor
23 February 1945	511th Parachute Infantry Regiment: 1st Btn., Co.B; Hdqt's Co., 1st Btn.; Hdqt's Co., 1st Btn., Light Machine Gun Platoon	Rescue 2,147 internees	130	Philippines	Los Baños Prison Camp
24 March 1945	17th Airborne Division (507 PIR, 513 PIR, 464 PFA, 466 PFA, 139 AEB, 224 AMC, 155 AAB, 411 AQM, 517 ASC, 680 GFA 681 GFA, 717 AOC & 194 GIR). Also small units: MP's, Division Artillery, Reconnaissance Platoon, & Parachute Maintenance Co.	Varsity	4,964	Germany	Wesel
23 June 1945	511th PIR	Gypsy	1,030	Philippines	Aparri
20 October 1950	187th ARCT, 2nd Battalion	DZ Easy	1,203	Korea	Sukchon
20 October 1950	187th ARCT, 1st, 3rd. Bn's.	DZ William	1,470	Korea	Sukchon
21 October 1950	187th Airborne Regimental Combat Team (ARCT).	DZ William	671	Korea	Sukchon
23 March 1951	187th ARCT, 2nd & 3rd Bns; 674th ABN Field Artillery Bn; 2nd & 4th ABN Ranger Cos, and Indian army surgical team.	Tomahawk	3,486	Korea	Munsan-Ni
12 February 1962	FTT-1 White Star SF Team	Nam Beng Valley Campaign vs. Pathet Lao	12	Laos	Nam Tha airstrip
2 January 1963	Joint General Staff reserve ARVN Paratroopers with U.S. MACV "Red Hat" Advisors from Saigon	Ap Bac	300 South Vietnamese, 2 Americans	South Vietnam	Ap Tan Thoi
22 February 1967	173rd Airborne Brigade, 503rd P.I.R., 2nd & 3rd Btl's; 3/319 Airborne Field Artillery Regiment (AFAR).	Junction City	845	Vietnam	Katum
2 April 1967	5th Special Force Group (ABN), 1st Special Forces: Detachments, A-503 Mike Force & A-344, Operation Harvest Moon (Includes Montagnards)	Harvest Moon	356 (includes Montagnards)	Vietnam	Bunard, Phouc Long "Happy Dragon" Province
5 September 1967	USMC, 1st Long Range Reconnaissance Patrol (LRRP)	Oregon	10	Vietnam	South
5 October 1967	5th Special Forces Group (ABN): Pathfinder Detachment (12 SF, 37 ARVN Pathfinders), "B" Co II CTZ (Pleiku) Mike Force (50 SF) & 275 LLDB (Includes Montagnards)	Blue Max	374	Vietnam	Bu Prang CIDG fighting camp, Quang Duc "Great Virtue" Province
1968–73?	Military Assistance Command, Vietnam – Studies and Observations Group (MACV-SOG) Airborne Studies Group (SOG 36)	Eldest Son, Italian Green, Pole Bean		North Vietnam, Laos, Cambodia	
28 November 1970	Recon Team Florida, CCN, MACV-SOG (High Altitude Low Opening [HALO])		3 Americans, one ARVN officer and 2 Montagnards	Laos	NVA road inside Laos
7 May 1971	Captain Larry Manes' Recon Team, CCN, MACV-SOG (HALO)		4 Americans	South Vietnam	Between Ashau Valley and Khe Sanh, NVA trail extension of Laotian Highway 921
22 June 1971	Sergeant Major Billy Waugh's Recon Team, CCN, MACV-SOG (HALO)		4 Americans	South Vietnam	60 miles SW of Danang
22 September 1971	Captain Jim Storter's Recon Team, CCC, MACV-SOG (HALO)		4 Americans	South Vietnam	Plei Trap Valley, NW of Pleiku
11 October 1971	Sgt. 1st Class Dick Gross' Recon Team, CCC, MACV-SOG (HALO)		5 Americans	Vietnam	25 miles, SW of Pleiku in the Ia Drang Valley
23 October 1983	Navy SEAL Team and USAF CCT	Urgent Fury	15	Grenada	Port Salines
25 October 1983	75th Ranger Regiment LRS Detachment; 82nd Abn Div combat controllers (CCT), Air Force Special Operations Command (AFSOC), 12 troopers; 4 troopers, 1st Bn, tactical air control parties (TACP).	Urgent Fury	16(?)	Grenada	Point Salines
25 October 1983	Navy SEAL Team	Urgent Fury	11	Grenada	Governor's residence
25 October 1983	75th Ranger Regiment 1st and 2nd Bns; and two paratroopers (SGT Spain and SPC Richardson from 307th Engineer Bn)	Urgent Fury	500	Grenada	Point Salines airfield
20 December 1989	Unit: 75th Ranger Regiment; 82nd Airborne Division Ready Brigade	Just Cause	4,000	Panama	Rio Hato east to Fort Cimarron
20 December 1989	75th Ranger Regiment; 82nd Abn Div, 1st Brigade Task Force: 1-504th PIR, 1-505th PIR; 2-504th PIR; 4-325th AIR, Co B and C; A/3-505 PIR; 3-73rd Armor (Abn); 82nd MP Co (Abn), 3 platoons. All joined to form: Task Force Pacific.	Just Cause	2,176	Panama	Torrijos-Tocumen Airport
15 January 1991	Special Forces Operational Detachment-Delta (HAHO)	Desert Storm	12	Iraq	Northwest desert
Dec. 1991	Navy SEAL Team 6	Raw Deal		Haiti	Navassa Island
19 October 2001	75th Ranger Regiment	Operation Enduring Freedom	200	Afghanistan	Objective Rhino
13 November 2001	3-75th Ranger Regiment	Operation Enduring Freedom		Afghanistan	In the vicinity of Alimarden Kan-E-Bagat
25 February 2003	2-75th Ranger Regiment; 3-504th PIR	Operation Enduring Freedom		Afghanistan	Near Chahar Borjak, Nimruz Province
24 March 2003	3-75th Ranger Regiment; 24th Special Tactics Squadron	Operation Iraqi Freedom		Iraq	Northwestern desert region of Iraq, Objective Serpent in the vicinity of Al Qaim
26 March 2003	173rd Airborne Brigade, 786th Security Forces Squadron	Operation Northern Delay	954	Iraq	Bashur Drop zone
28–29 Mar 2003	27th Engineer Battalion; 3-75th Ranger Regiment; 24th Special Tactics Squadron	Operation Iraqi Freedom		Iraq	At H1 Airfield
3 July 2004	75th Ranger Regiment, Regimental Reconnaissance Company Team 3 (HALO)	Operation Enduring Freedom		Afghanistan	Southeastern Region (Tillman Dropzone)
31 July 2004	USMC 1st Reconnaissance Battalion (HAHO)	Operation Iraqi Freedom	6	Iraq	Near Baghdad
30 May 2007	ODA 074, 3-10th Special Forces Group (HALO)	Operation Iraqi Freedom	11	Iraq	Ninewah Province
11 July 2009	75th Ranger Regiment, Regimental Reconnaissance Company, Team 1	Operation Enduring Freedom		Afghanistan	
