= Parachute rigger =

Person who is trained or licensed to pack, maintain or repair parachutes

A parachute rigger is a person who is trained or licensed to pack, maintain or repair parachutes. A rigger is required to understand fabrics, hardware, webbing, regulations, sewing, packing, and other aspects related to the building, packing, repair, and maintenance of parachutes.

== Military parachute riggers ==
Militaries around the world train their own parachute riggers to support their airborne or paratrooper forces. These military riggers also pack parachutes for aerial delivery operations, through which military supplies and equipment are delivered by aircraft to combat zones.

=== Australian Defence Force ===
Parachute riggers in the Australian Army are responsible for the preparation, maintenance and supply of parachutes and other aerial delivery components.

Prior to commencing the parachute rigger course, all trainees must be static-line parachute qualified. Parachute riggers frequently make parachute jumps, and at any time may be required to jump with any parachute they have packed. This is to help them better understand how the equipment they prepare and maintain works, and to help ensure that each parachute is professionally packed to a safe standard.

=== Canadian Forces ===
Riggers in the Canadian Forces train at the Canadian Army Advanced Warfare Centre at CFB Trenton in Trenton, Ontario.

When Canada entered the airborne world with the creation of two airborne battalions in 1942, all the would-be jumpers were trained at Fort Benning, Georgia or Ringway, UK. Later, however, the flow of reinforcements for the parachute battalions posed an acute problem and it was decided to remedy this situation by training paratroopers in Canada. In May 1943, a Canadian Parachute Training Centre was formed in Shilo, Manitoba. With background knowledge in American and British parachuting techniques, Canadian trainers were able to develop a truly Canadian method of parachuting by incorporating the best features of both the American and British systems. Following several name and location changes, the school was moved to Edmonton in 1970 as the Canadian Airborne Centre (CABC) and then moved to Trenton in August 1996, becoming the Canadian Parachute Centre (CPC). On 1 April 1998 the former Canadian Forces Parachute Maintenance Depot (CFPMD) was amalgamated into CPC as Support Company.

On 1 April 2006 the renaming of CPC to CFLAWC began a transformation that was more than just another name change. CFLAWC became the Centre of Excellence (CoE) for Land Advanced Warfare, in addition to its previous focus on delivery of training. To meet the new challenges and added responsibilities, CFLAWC is currently organized with a Command team, Training Company, Support Company with the Canadian Forces Parachute Team (CFPT - the SkyHawks) and a Headquarters Company that includes the Standards Section, the Airborne Trials and Evaluation Section (ATES) and the Unit Orderly Room (UOR). Training Company is organized into four subject matter expert (SME) platoons for the conduct of the majority of the courses at CFLAWC. Support Company is based on the old CFPMD structure and provides the CF with parachute packing and maintenance services including the major repair of parachutes and associated aerial delivery equipment. Support Company is also responsible for training all parachute rigger specialists in the CF. It traces its roots to 1943 as part of the Canadian Army Parachute Training Centre. In those early days, parachute trainees were taught to pack their own parachutes, but this system was soon discarded as impractical and the packing and maintenance of parachutes became a centralized operation. Since its formation, Support Company has changed its name from 28 Central Ordnance Depot to 28 Canadian Forces Supply Depot in 1968, and upon the move from Camp Shilo, MB to Edmonton, AB in 1970, was given the name Canadian Forces Parachute Maintenance Depot. All riggers are jumpers and can be asked at any time to jump with a parachute they have packed.

CFLAWC currently delivers, as part of the Army National Individual Training Calendar, the following courses: the Arctic Operations Advisor Course, Drop Zone/ Landing Zone Controller, Aerial Delivery, Basic Helicopter Operations, Basic Parachuting, Jump Master, Parachute Instructor, Static Line Square canopy Parachuting, the three different phases of Parachute Rigger training, the Advanced Mountain Operations Course, the Helicopter Insertion Instructor Course, Military Freefall Parachuting, Military Freefall Jump Master, Military Freefall Parachute Instructor and a revised Patrol Pathfinder Course.

Parachute Riggers/Packers in training attend the 15-day Basic Parachute qualification course at CFB Trenton, and then for approximately 2.5–3 years undertake three different 45-day courses that cover maintaining parachutes, packing parachutes, and quality control of parachutes.

=== United States Armed Forces ===
Riggers have played an important role in the American military since the advent of the use of the parachute for aerial insertion of troops, supplies, and equipment into combat zones. In addition to the maroon beret worn by paratroopers in airborne units, riggers are authorized the wear of a distinctive red baseball cap as their military headgear when on rigger duties.

==== U.S. Army ====
U.S. Army Parachute Rigger Badge

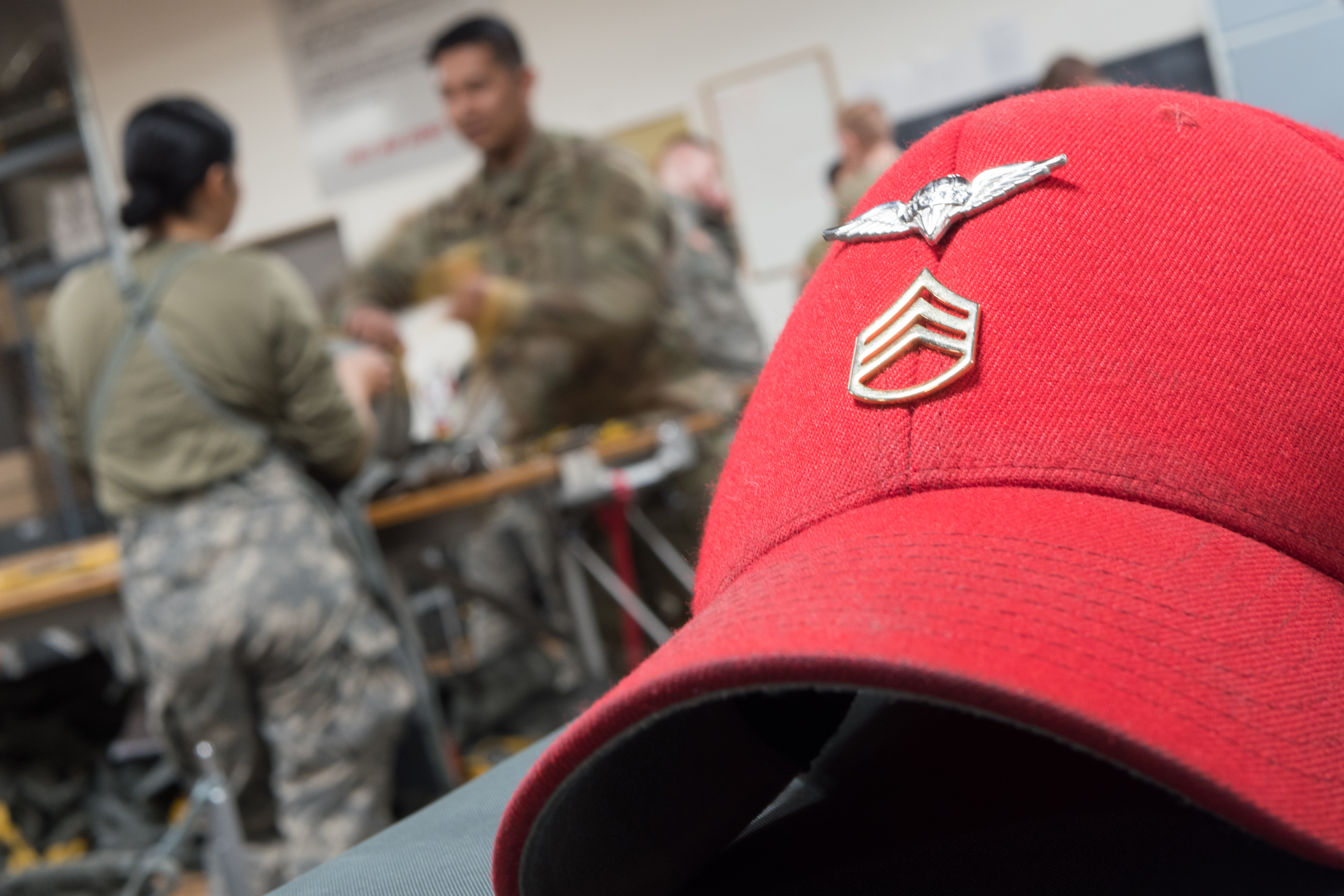
U.S. Army Parachute Rigger's distinctive headgear with Parachute Rigger Badge and rank insignia

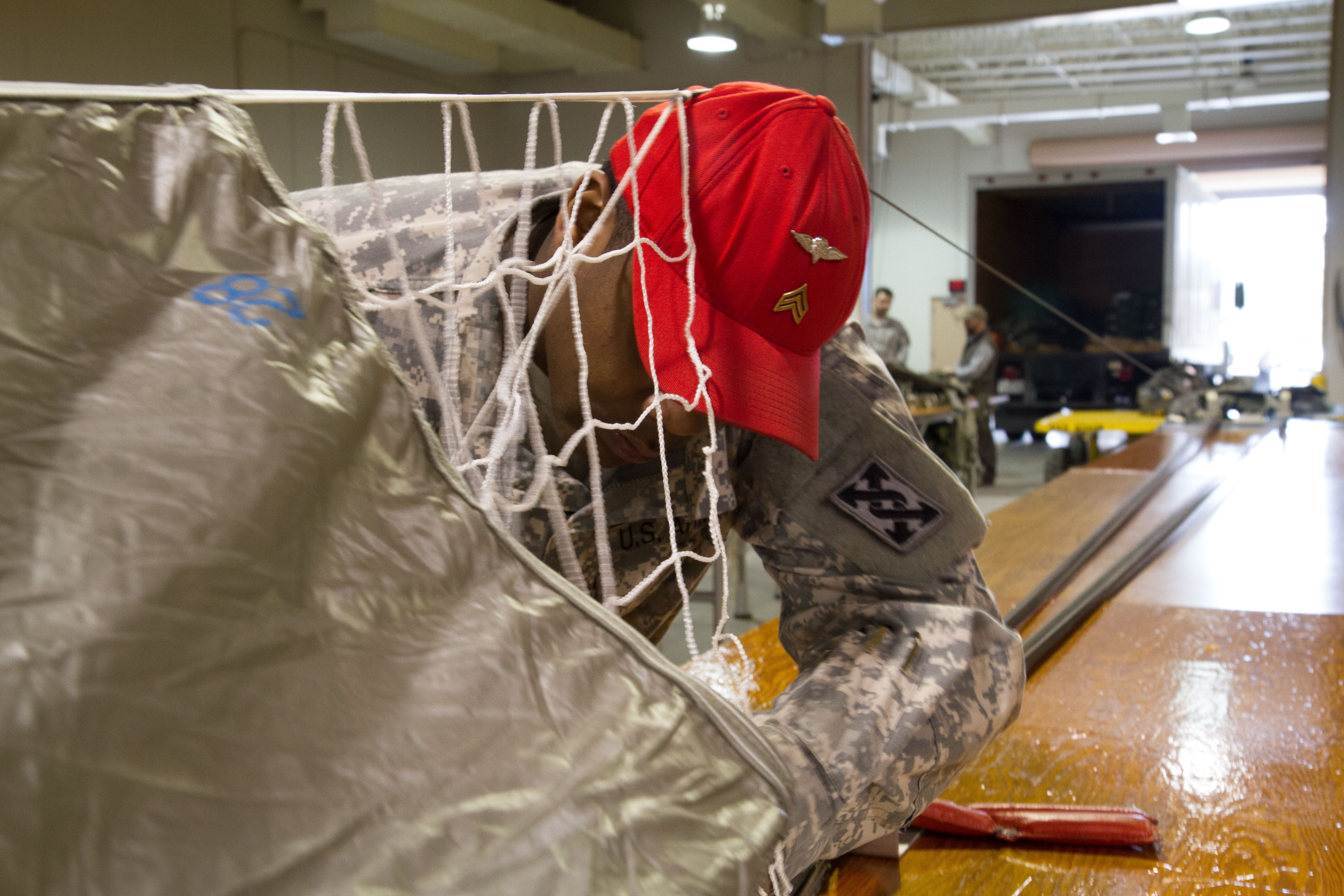
A U.S. Army Parachute Rigger with the 824th Quartermaster Company inspects an MC-6 Maneuverable Troop Parachute System at Fort Bragg

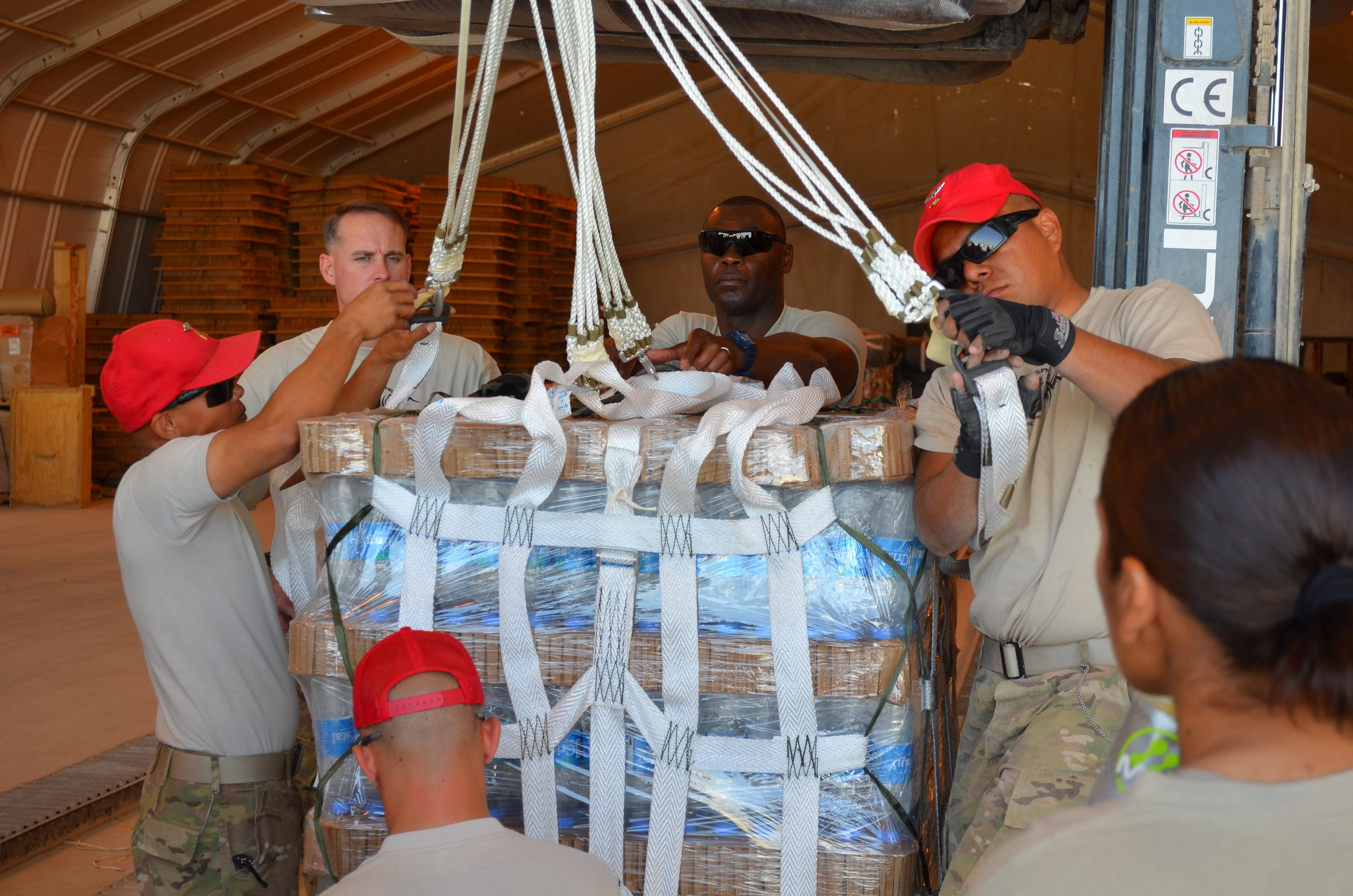
U.S. Army Parachute Riggers demonstrate hooking a parachute to a pallet, part of the "Teach Me How to Rig" event at Kandahar Airfield, Afghanistan

When the U.S. Army formed its first paratrooper unit in 1940, a parachute test platoon, the paratroopers themselves prepared and took care of their own parachutes. The test platoon had only 3 men, two enlisted soldiers and one warrant officer, from the Army Air Corps serving as the precursors of the U.S. Army's parachute riggers.

When the U.S. Army created five Airborne divisions for World War II, the U.S. Army stopped training paratroopers on how to pack their own chutes and started support organizations for parachute packing and rigging. The first riggers received their training at Fort Benning, Georgia.

After 1950, the U.S. Army assigned the Quartermaster Corps with the mission of aerial delivery, including parachute rigging. A parachute rigger course was established at the U.S. Army Quartermaster School at Fort Gregg-Adams in 1951, and has continued since then.

Airborne Orientation Course. For students completing basic training at Fort Jackson, South Carolina, preparation for Airborne and rigger training begins before even departing for Fort Gregg-Adams with attendance at the post's Airborne Orientation Course. According to an Army News Service story, "while most of the course involves physical training, soldiers are also familiarized with such Airborne operations as parachute landing falls, rigging equipment and actions in the aircraft." The AOC has raised the success rate for soldiers subsequently attending Airborne training from 60 percent to 89 percent.

From AOC, rigger recruits go to Airborne School at Fort Benning, Georgia. If a rigger recruit does not pass Airborne School, that soldier is reclassified.

The U.S. Army MOS (Military Occupational Specialty) designation for parachute riggers is graded in five skill levels, from 92R1P to 92R5P. Prior to fiscal year 2003, it was 43E2P. Recruits are designated 92R0P.

After Airborne School, 92R0P recruits head to Fort Gregg-Adams to attend the 13-week Parachute Rigger Course. The course provides training on inspecting, packing, rigging, recovering, storing, and maintaining air item equipment. It is divided into three phases. Air Drop Phase - Includes instruction in cargo parachute packing, rigging supplies and equipment for airdrop, types and limitations of aircraft. Students become proficient in the use of the various technical manuals for rigging airdrop loads. At the conclusion of the instruction, the students participate in an airdrop exercise. They pack the cargo parachutes, rig the loads to be dropped and place the loads in the aircraft. After the airdrop, the students recover the loads and equipment. Aerial Equipment Repair Phase - Trains fundamentals and procedures of inspection, classification, and repair of maintenance of personnel, cargo, extraction parachutes and airdrop equipment to include the service of High Altitude Low Opening (HALO) Automatic Ripcord Release (ARR). Parachute Pack Phase - Is designed to equip students with the working knowledge of inspection and packing procedures relative to personnel, light cargo and extraction parachutes. The student receives concentrated instruction on the troop back parachute. The student is required to jump the parachute he/she packed during the examination. Throughout the course, the student is constantly reminded of the fact that all parachutes must be packed with meticulous care to insure proper functioning. Any malfunction could result in death or in equipment loss.

All U.S. Army parachute riggers are required to be Airborne qualified, and by tradition are required to be prepared to jump any parachute packed by any U.S. Army parachute rigger, without checking the log book for the name of the rigger who last prepared it. The official motto of the U.S. Army parachute rigger is: "I will be sure always."

Service members from other branches of the U.S. Armed Forces also attend parachute rigger courses at Fort Gregg-Adams.

==== U.S. Air Force ====
Operations Support Badge, worn by Aircrew Flight Equipment maintainers

United States Air Force parachute riggers are trained at Sheppard AFB in Texas. The career field is classified under "Aircrew Flight Equipment." Airmen attend a 3½-month course learning to inspect, pack, and repair emergency parachutes, as well as a wide variety of other types of aircrew equipment. Once graduated from this technical school, students are assigned to a duty location where they are further instructed using on the job training. USAF aerial delivery riggers (2T2X1) packed training airdrop loads for airlift units. In recent years, Aerial Delivery Air Force riggers have been replaced by contract civilian employees since the mission does not require deployment overseas, and instead consists of supporting training missions at home station.

In mid-2009, the U.S. Air Force's 98th Virtual Uniform Board announced "Airmen earning and awarded the Army Parachute Riggers badge are authorized permanent wear on all uniform combinations. For the airman battle uniform and the battle dress uniform, the badge will be blue." Previous guidance had limited the wear of the badge to airmen attached to U.S. Army rigger units.

==== U.S. Navy and Marine Corps ====
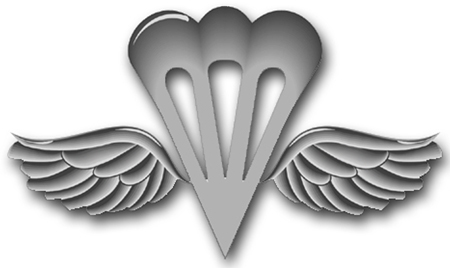
PR rate insignia

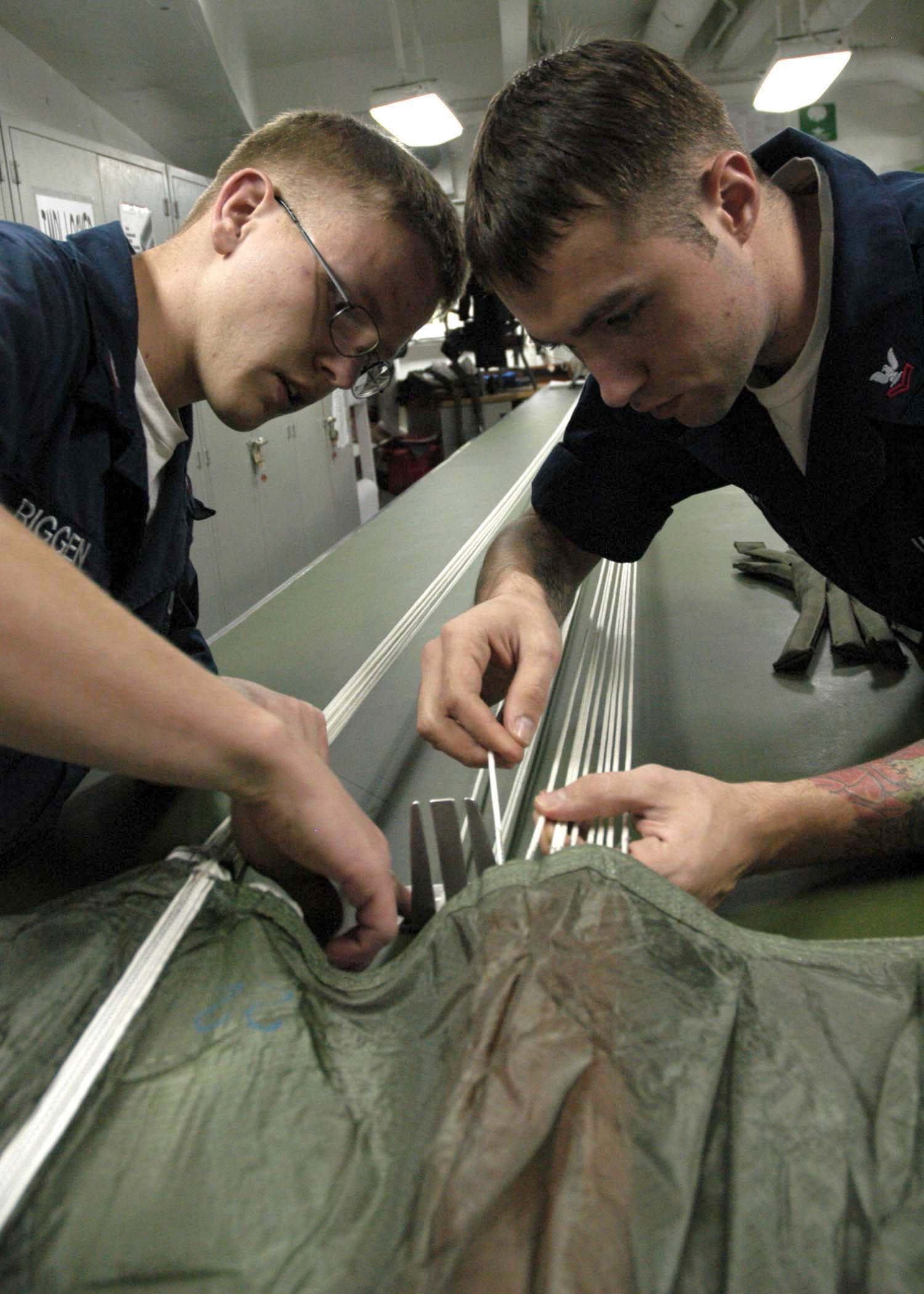
Aircrew Survival Equipmentmen whip and fold gores of a parachute during a 224-day inspection in the paraloft aboard the USS Abraham Lincoln.

===== History =====
The Parachute Materials School was first established in 1924 at Lakehurst, New Jersey by two U.S. Navy chief petty officers. Parachute Rigger, or "PR", became an enlisted job rating in 1942, but the name changed during the 1960s to Aircrew Survival Equipmentman.

===== Training =====
The United States Navy parachute riggers are now trained at Naval Air Station Pensacola during a 12-week (55-training-day) school. When they graduate, they do become PRs, but the rating is called Aircrew Survival Equipmentman. While in school they go through nine courses: three courses of "Common Core" skills over 19 days, three courses of Organizational-Level skills for 17 days, and finishing with three courses of Intermediate-Level skills for 19 days. The first week is a course taught on materials manufacturing using the Consew 206RB-5 industrial sewing machine, dubbed by students and instructors alike as "Combat Rigger Sewing" or simply "Combat Sewing". Students will manufacture a "rigger bag" completely from scratch and will learn about tool control. The next course is NB-8 parachutes, where students will learn basics of parachute rigging, inspection cycles and nomenclature. This is followed by a course of general survival equipment named ESE. Then "O" strand begins with Survival I Fixed Wing, followed by Survival II Rotary Wing, where students learn inspection and maintenance concepts unique to squadron level work. The final "O" level subject is Survival Radios. "I" strand will start with NES-12 ballistic parachute, the Navy's most complicated parachute system, for advanced rigging concepts. Seat Survival Kits and Life Preservers finish out the entire course of instruction, where they will graduate upon completion. The PR "A" School House graduates one class every seven training days. The Navy Enlisted Classification Code (NEC) of 7356-Aircrew Survival Equipmentman (IMA) Technician is awardable upon completion of advanced C-level training.

During the entire time of study students will undergo physical training at least three times a week, be subjected to rigorous inspections every Monday, and will march to and from the building, being accountable for showing up on time, cleanliness, and homework. No student is allowed to continue in the course if their grade average falls below a 90, making it one of the most challenging courses at the Naval Aviation Technical Training Center. Equivalence to Federal Aviation Administration (FAA) parachute riggers is determined by years of service and/or number of parachutes packed. Generally, a Navy/Marine PR3(E-4) with three years experience is equivalent to an FAA "Senior Parachute Rigger", and a PR2(E-5) equivalent to an FAA "Master Parachute Rigger". Military students without a rigger logbook will have to provide proof of experience. An original statement providing rating/rank description and time-in-service on a unit letterhead signed by the Commander, Division Officer, or Supervisor will be required for FAA licensing.

===== Profession =====
After finishing A-school, PR's will be assigned to their first duty station. This will likely be a Sea-Duty tour, however some personnel are assigned to a shore unit. A sea tour may require working with an F/A-18 Hornet squadron or on an aircraft carrier. Shore tours involve supporting sea-going commands at facilities around the world including NAS Whidbey Island, NAS Jacksonville, Naval Station Norfolk, Naval Station San Diego, NAS Lemoore, Naval Support Activity Bahrain and others. Most PR's will perform the inspection and repair of Aviation Life Support Systems equipment that includes life preservers, life rafts, parachutes, oxygen hoses and regulators, ejection seats, radios, medical equipment and supplies, safety flares, mountaineering equipment, cold weather equipment and other items related to the survival of aviators who may eject or egress from their aircraft in unfavorable conditions.

==== Naval Special Operations Parachute Rigger ====
Special Operations Parachute Riggers assist Naval Special Warfare (NSW), US Navy SEALs, and Explosive Ordnance Disposal (EOD) units throughout the world. They inspect, maintain, pack, and use specialized premeditated personnel static-line and free-fall parachute systems. They use and maintain specialized aerial delivery and re-supply systems, and helicopter insertion and extraction systems unique to NSW and EOD units. They function as Parachute Jump (P.J.) and Helicopter Rope Suspension Techniques (HRST) masters. They also perform paraloft management, administrative functions, ordnance handling functions, and Quality Assurance (Q.A.) inspections.

The Navy Enlisted Classification Code (NEC) of 7353-Special Operations Parachute Rigger is awardable upon completion of Army courses 431 F3 PARA NAVY or 860 43E10. Special Operations Parachute Rigger NEC OJT is awardable if personnel attached to a rigger unit of EOD for 1 year and observed by Army/Navy school graduate and qualified prior to 1 July 1990. Personnel other than Parachute Riggers must hold NEC 53XX to be assigned this NEC

There are a select few who perform duties as a Special Operations Parachute Rigger. The minimum prerequisite qualifications are graduating the Basic Airborne course at Fort Benning, GA and the EOD Rigger course at Fort Gregg-Adams, Virginia. Although their primary duty is to maintain parachuting equipment, many go on to achieve greater qualifications such as Static Line Jumpmaster, Military Free Fall Parachutist, Military Free Fall Jumpmaster, Air Load Planner, Hazardous Cargo Certifier, FAA Master Parachute Rigger, Rappel Master, and Fast Rope Master.

==== USMC parachute riggers ====
US Marine Corps parachute riggers hold a primary MOS of 0451 (Air Delivery Specialist) and serve predominantly with an Air Delivery Platoon that is resident within each Marine division’s logistic group. Air Delivery Specialists also serve in other USMC units that have an airborne capability such as reconnaissance units (both division and force level), US Marine Corps Forces Special Operations Command, and Air Naval Gunfire Liaison Companies. Air Delivery Specialist assigned to any of the aforementioned units, provide additional combat support as they are integrated into those formation's quick reaction force.

Air Delivery Specialists attend the U.S. Army Basic Airborne Course, and afterwards, the U.S. Army Parachute Rigger course.

==== U.S. Coast Guard ====
AST rate insignia

U.S. Coast Guard Aviation Survival Technicians (ASTs) inspect and maintain all personnel and aerial delivery parachutes. The AST rating was originally formed when the U.S. Coast Guard combined Parachute Rigger (PR) and Aviation Ordnanceman (AO) in 1968 forming the Aviation Survivalman (ASM) rating. All U.S. Coast Guard ASMs trained at NATTC Lakehurst, NJ until 1979 when the USCG ATTC, Elizabeth City, NC opened ASM "A" school. In the late 1990s the Coast Guard renamed the rating Aviation Survival Technician (AST).

== Civilian parachute riggers ==
Riggers who work on the parachutes of sport parachutists are usually certified by the local aviation authorities, a local aviation association, or a parachuting association. The licensing system varies from country to country, but usually there are several levels of licenses, the higher licenses giving the rigger more privileges in the field. In the US, former and active duty military parachute riggers are allowed credit for FAA certification upon recommendation of commanding officer or providing officials with documentation of recorded parachute packs.

=== Canada ===
In Canada, parachute rigger ratings are issued by the Canadian Sport Parachuting Association's Technical Committee. CSPA issues two levels of rigger ratings: A and B.

The CSPA rigger A rating has an A1 and A2 sub-class allowing progressively more privileges. The basic rigger A requirements are that the applicant have minimum of CSPA "B" Certificate of Proficiency, be the age of majority in the province where the course is given and have packed ten reserves under supervision of a CSPA Rigger A-Continuous or greater. Applicants then attend a one-week course given by a CSPA Rigger Instructor.

Canadian Rigger As are limited to assembling and packing sport parachutes. They can replace components and do simple hand-sewing. At the end of the Rigger A Course candidates can choose to be tested on round or square parachutes and they can choose which type of container for their practical test (one-pin sport, two-pin sport, Pop-Top or chest). New CSPA Rigger A licensees are issued a temporary rating and must pack 10 reserves within the next 12 months to earn their "continuous" rating. Additional certifications are available to permit rigger As to pack tandem and Pilot Emergency Parachutes (PEP). The Rigger A1 and A2 sub-classes allow use of sewing machines to patch parachutes and change lines.

Two more years of experience, including learning sewing machine operation, is needed before riggers can challenge for Rigger B ratings. The SOLO program includes sewing a bag of samples and submitting them to CSPA's Technical Committee. CSPA Rigger Bs enjoy the same privileges as American Master Riggers and are allowed to do most major repairs that can be done outside of a factory.

=== United Kingdom ===
In the United Kingdom, sport parachute rigger ratings are issued by the British Parachute Association's Rigging Committee, itself a subcommittee of the Safety and Training Committee. The BPA issues two working levels of riggers rating: Parachute Rigger and Advanced Rigger.

- A Parachute Rigger is authorised to manufacture new components as listed in the BPA Parachute Rigger Manufacturing Syllabus. They are not cleared for harness manufacture or harness work, nor repair work or modifications to reserve canopies, reserve containers or reserve component parts.
- An Advanced Rigger is cleared for all work on all sport parachute assemblies.

To become a BPA Parachute Rigger, first a candidate must become a BPA Advanced Packer, which certifies them to pack reserve parachutes. Following this they become a BPA Basic Rigger. This is their apprenticeship whereby they work under the supervision of an appropriately qualified rigger and where they gain experience manufacturing parachute component parts and repairing damaged parachutes and systems. Following this and a successful attendance on a BPA Parachute Rigger exam course, the candidate becomes a BPA Parachute Rigger.

The next level is a BPA Advanced Rigger, whereby Parachute Riggers of at least two years standing can attend a BPA Advanced Rigger course. This involves major repairs to canopies and container systems including harness work. In advance of the course, the candidate must also manufacture a full skydiving container system including component parts for assessment at the course.

Such courses are administered by at least two BPA Rigger Examiners. A Rigger Examiner is a BPA Advanced Rigger who has been successfully assessed on his ability to run Advanced Packer courses, Basic Rigger courses and Parachute Rigger courses.

The following documents record the criteria for examination and work limitations for each BPA Rigger rating:

- Form 199 Basic Riggers Course syllabus
- Form 200 Parachute Riggers Course Syllabus
- Form 201 Advanced Riggers Course Syllabus
- Form 202 Rigger Examiner Course Syllabus

Also of relevance are the following documents:

- Form 238 List of all BPA Rigging Related Documents
- Form 169 Advanced Packing Course Syllabus

=== United States ===
In the U.S., the Federal Aviation Administration (FAA) licenses civilian riggers. The FAA issues two levels of civilian parachute rigger ratings: senior and master. Entry-level riggers start by apprenticing under another licensed rigger, then test for the Senior Rigger rating. The Senior Rigger test involves three parts: written, oral and practical. The written test is usually done at a computerized learning center and results are available immediately.

The oral and practical exams include questions about common rigging practices. The practical test consists of inspecting and repacking 20 reserves, along with hand sewing and a simple machine-sewn patch on a canopy. Candidates have the option of testing on back, chest, seat or lap type parachutes. The FAA does not distinguish between round and (modern) square parachutes.

After three years experience—including packing at least 200 reserves, 100 each of two different types—Senior Riggers can test for the Master Rigger rating which allows them to do most major repairs. There is no written test for Master Riggers, but the oral exam is far more extensive, including identifying dozens of material samples. The Master practical exam starts with assembling and adjusting a sewing machine, then doing a major canopy repair that includes a seam, reinforcing tape and line attachment. Master candidates are usually asked to demonstrate a harness repair also. FAA riggers are tested by Parachute Rigger Examiners (government employees) or Designated Parachute Rigger Examiners (independent civilians, usually highly experienced Master Riggers). U.S. military riggers only need a letter from their commanding officer and the written test to earn FAA rigger ratings.

== See also ==
- Parachuting equipment
- British Parachute Association
