= Kelly Mogk Larson =

American female aviator

- Kelly Mogk Larsen (right) receiving her commission
- Born: Kelly M. Mogk
- Military career
- Allegiance: United States
- Branch: United States Coast Guard
- Rank: Lieutenant commander

Kelly Larson (née Mogk) is an American retired Coast Guard officer. On May 23, 1986, she became the first woman to complete Coast Guard rescue swimmer School in the United States. She had joined the Coast Guard two years earlier, in 1984. She earned an Air Medal in 1989 for rescuing a downed Air National Guard F-4 pilot. In 2009, she retired with the rank of lieutenant commander. She was inducted into the Women in Aviation International Pioneer Hall of Fame in 2019.
