= Parachute Rigger Badge =

- Type: Badge
- Awarded for: Completion of the U.S. Army Quartermaster School’s course on parachute combat supply, preparation, and deployment.
- Presented by: United States Army and United States Air Force
- Status: Currently awarded
- Established: 9 June 1986 (official)
- First award: 1949

Army Precedence
- Next (higher): Parachutist Badges
- Next (lower): Military Free Fall Parachutist Badge

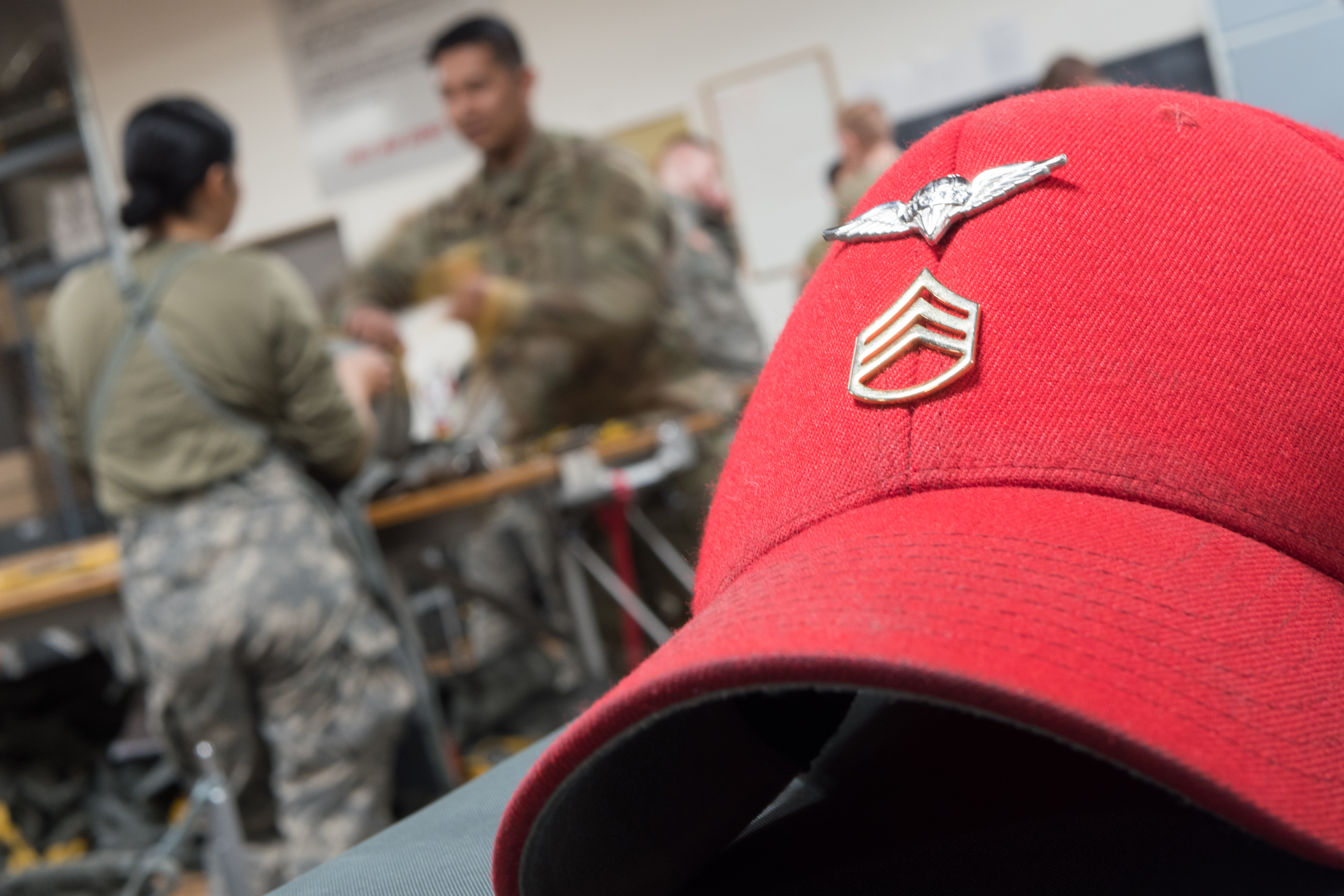
U.S. Army's Parachute Rigger distinctive cover with Parachute Rigger Badge and rank insignia

The Parachute Rigger Badge is a military qualification badge of the United States Army and the United States Air Force which was first created in 1948 and officially approved in June 1986. The award is intended as a badge for enlisted, warrant officer and officer personnel who have successfully completed parachute rigger courses specified by the U.S. Army Quartermaster Center and School.

== History ==
The first parachute rigger badge was designed in 1948 by Major Thomas R. Cross and drawn by Sergeant First Class Ewing of the 11th Parachute Maintenance Company, 11th Airborne Division at Camp Schimmelpfennig, Sendai, Japan, and was first used operationally during Exercise Swarmer in 1950.

Prior to the official adoption of the badge, it had been worn under Major Command commander's authority to authorize the wear of locally designed badges on the utility uniform.

Official adoption of the badge had been sought for many years by a variety of Quartermaster officials. The adoption was based on a formal request submitted by Mr. James S. Emery, Military Analyst, Airborne Department, Quartermaster School in 1983. Emery, formerly COL Emery, had at one time been the officer in charge of the Rigger School. Under his command, the school installed the first female Rigger Instructors in 1977: Deborah Petrie, Maintenance; Joann Jackson, Pack; and Stacy Kates, Air Drop. Emery's request received unprecedented support from the field; unfortunately it was disapproved at the time. In 1986, General Richard H. Thompson, commander of the U.S. Army Materiel Command and the senior Quartermaster officer in the Army wrote the Chief of Staff of the Army asking him to reconsider the 1983 decision. After requesting some field comments, General Wickham approved the parachute riggers badge on 9 June 1986.

== Badge eligibility ==
In order to be eligible to attend any Parachute Rigger courses and subsequently be awarded the Parachute Rigger Badge, an individual must first have graduated from the Basic Airborne Course at Ft. Benning, Georgia.

The badge is awarded upon graduation from a parachute rigger course as specified by the U.S. Army Quartermaster Center and School. In 1999, the Army authorized the retroactive award of the Parachute Rigger Badge to individuals who performed duty as riggers before May 1951, but did not attend or graduate for a Parachute Rigger course at the U.S. Army Quartermaster Center and School, located at Ft. Lee, Virginia.

The first Military Occupational Specialty for the Parachute Rigger was 43E. Later, those earning the Parachute Rigger Badge receive either the Enlisted Military Occupational Specialty Code 92R or the Warrant Officer designation 921A. The Parachute Rigger Badge may also be awarded to officers, upon completion of the Aerial Delivery Management Officer Course (ADMOC) who earn the Additional Skill Identifier of 92AR9. or other courses specified by AR 600-8-22.

The Parachute Rigger badge can be revoked when the Parachutist Badge is revoked, when an individual refuses an order to make a parachute jump with a parachute the individual packed, or when the individual initiates an action which results in withdrawal of the individual's MOS before the individual completes 36 months in a parachute position.

== Air Force authorization ==
In mid-2009, the Air Force's 98th Virtual Uniform Board announced "Airmen earning and awarded the Parachute Riggers Badge are authorized permanent wear on all uniform combinations. For the airman battle uniform and the battle dress uniform, the badge will be blue. On the desert combat uniform the approved color is brown." In January 2014, the Air Force expanded that decision to allow the permanent wear of any special skill badge that has been awarded by another service.

Previous guidance had limited the wear of the badge to airmen attached to Army rigger units. Air Force parachute riggers are typically found in the aerial port squadron of an airlift wing or group, where they pack loads for training airdrops. Others, trained in the maintenance of aircrew emergency parachutes and other aircrew equipment, are assigned to flying unit life support sections.

== See also ==
- Air Assault Badge
- Glider Badge
- Pathfinder Badge
- Badges of the United States Army
- Badges of the United States Air Force
