= Aircrew survival equipmentman =

Aircrew Survival Equipmentman
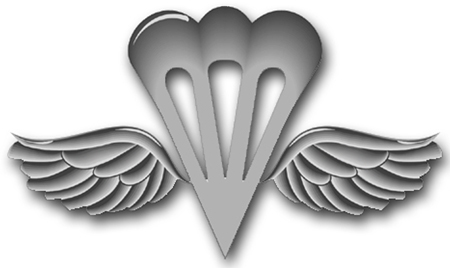
- Aircrew Survival Equipmentman (PR) rating insignia
- Issued by: United States Navy
- Type: Enlisted rating
- Abbreviation: PR
- Specialty: Survival equipment specialists

Aircrew survival equipmentmen are survival equipment specialists and certified parachute riggers who oversee valuable life saving equipment, parachutes, and other special gear used by U.S. Naval and Marine Corps special operations forces, Naval Air Department, and the United States Navy Parachute Team known as the "Leap Frogs". They perform a wide range of duties, which include inspecting, maintaining, and repairing parachutes, search and rescue equipment, along with survival kits, medical kits, flight clothing, protective wear, night vision equipment, aircrew oxygen systems, liquid oxygen converters, anti-exposure suits, and g-suits. PRs operate and maintain carbon dioxide transfer and recharge equipment, operate and repair sewing machines as well as train aircrew and other personnel in parachute rigging and the use of safety and survival equipment.

== History ==
The PR rating was established in 1942 to help meet World War II parachute survival requirements. When founded, the PR rating consisted only of the general service rating with career progression from striker status through PRC. For safety reasons, service members are no longer allowed to "strike" for PR and must attend the appropriate technical schools to be designated in this rating. The original title of the rating was parachute rigger. The rating title was changed to its present title of aircrew survival equipmentman in December, 1965. The reason for changing the title from parachute rigger to aircrew survival equipmentman was to provide a more realistic description of the types of duties performed by PRs. However, aircrew survival equipmentmen maintained their official abbreviated title of "PR" after the 1965 name change.

Following a fatal training accident in the 1980s, students are no longer required to complete the basic parachute jump to earn their rating badge.

== Training ==
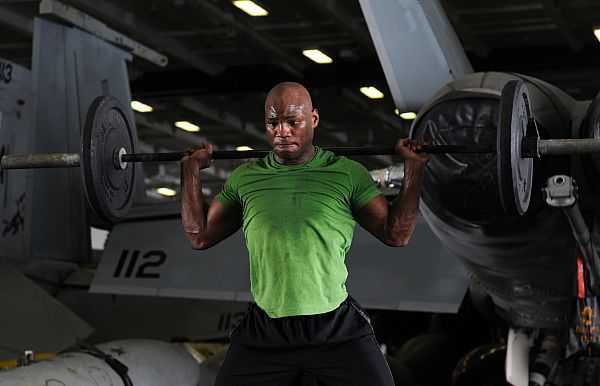
ARABIAN SEA (Aug. 16, 2011) U.S. Navy Parachute Rigger Rashard C. Lovelace lifts weights in the hangar bay aboard the aircraft carrier USS George H.W. Bush (CVN 77).

=== Naval Aviation Technical Training Center ===
United States Navy parachute riggers are now trained at Naval Air Station Pensacola during a twelve-week (55 training days) school (the initial school, or "A school", for the rating). The school includes nine courses: three courses of "common core" skills over 19 days, three courses of organizational-level (O-level) skills for 17 days, and three courses of intermediate-level (I-level) skills for 19 days.

Throughout the course of instruction, students undergo physical training at least three times a week, are subjected to rigorous inspections every Monday, and march between buildings. Students must maintain a grade average of 80 to remain in the course.

=== Organizational level course ===
O-level begins with instruction in sewing. Students are then taught to manufacture a complete rigger bag from scratch and learn the importance and policies of tool control. The next course is NB-8 parachutes, in which students learn the basics of parachute rigging, inspection cycles, and nomenclature. This is followed by a course about general survival equipment named ESE. The organizational series of courses follows, beginning with survival I fixed wing followed by survival II rotary wing, in which students learn inspection and maintenance concepts unique to squadron-level work. The final O-level subject is survival radios.

While the rating is closed to non graduates, O-level certification for minor repairs and inspections may be attained by helicopter flight crew personnel who maintain and repair equipment at sea in the absence of a parachute rigger.

=== Intermediate level course ===
I-level series of courses starts with NES-12, the Navy's most complicated parachute system, for advanced rigging concepts. Seat survival kits and life preservers complete the course of instruction. One class graduates from the PR A school every seven training days.

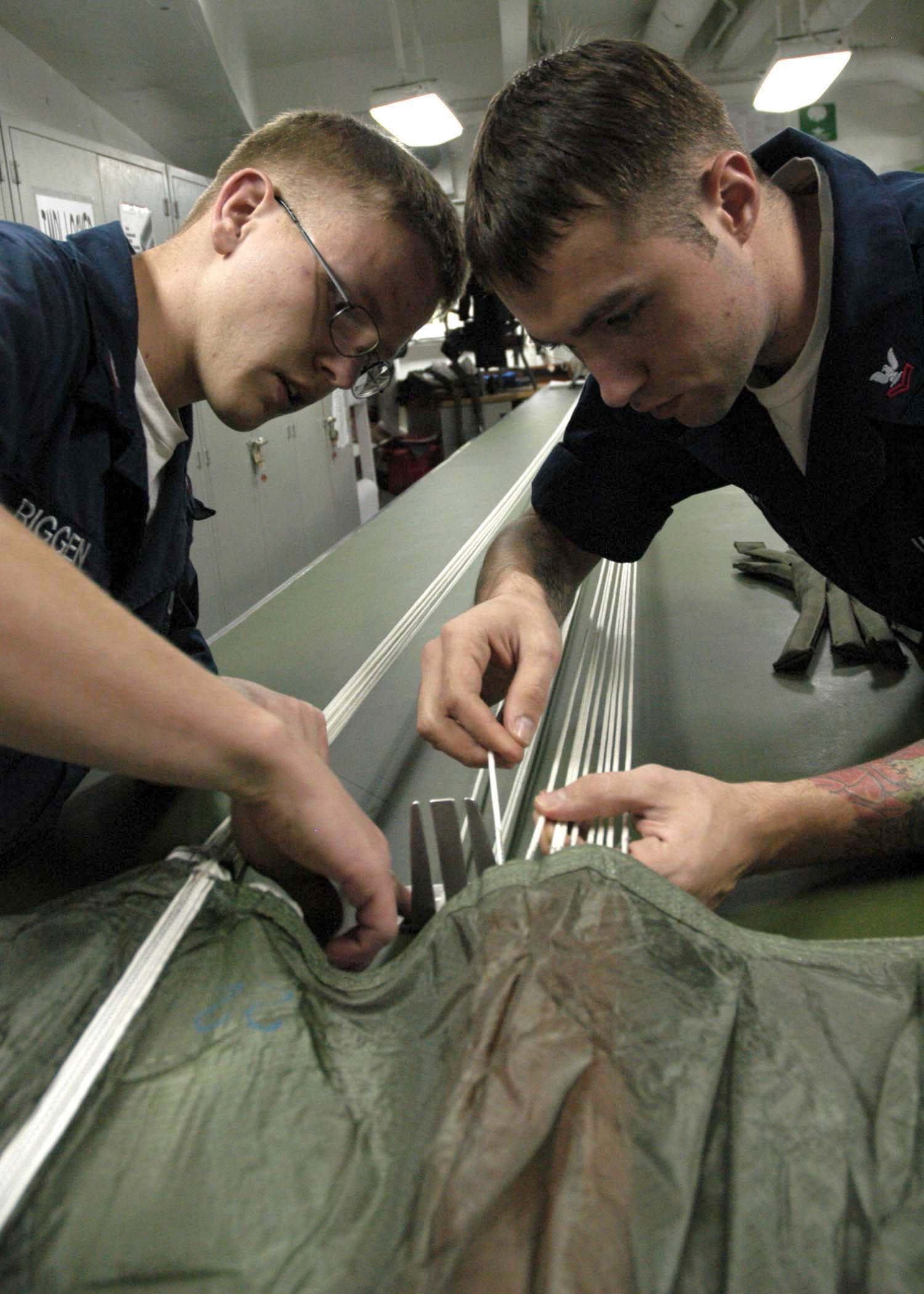
Aircrew survival equipmentmen whip and fold gores of a parachute during a 224-day inspection in the paraloft aboard the USS Abraham Lincoln

=== Advanced training ===
In addition to "A" School, "C" and "F" schools offer specialty training in oxygen systems and sewing machine repair. These schools require the student to enlist for a period of 6 years and are often a prerequisite for senior level positions in a paraloft.

=== Credit recommendations ===
The American Council on Education recommends that two semester hour credits be awarded in the vocational certificate category in sewing machine operation, service, and maintenance, and two in parachute packing and inspection; additionally, 3 semester hours in lower-division bachelor's/associate degree category in aviation safety equipment repair/maintenance. Credits may also be earned for other follow-on training ("C" schools) throughout your career.

=== Master and senior parachute rigger licensing ===
Federal Aviation Administration will grant a Senior parachute rigger license and ratings to any military parachute rigger with a letter of recommendation from their commanding officer and a written exam. Master parachute rigger licensing may be attained after the service members presents evidence to the FAA that he has had at least 3 years of experience as a parachute rigger, and has satisfactorily packed at least 100 parachutes of each two types in common use. Specific guidelines for this process are detailed in FAA Regulations Sub Part F 65.117.

== Rating badges and parachutist insignia ==
Basic parachutist badge

Originally designed in 1942 as the U.S. Navy Certified Parachute Rigger badge by American Insignia Company. Officially changed to the Navy & Marine Corps Parachutist badge in 1963 at the request of the Marine Corps.

The PR rating badge for enlisted personnel may only be worn by service members who have completed Parachute Rigger "A" school.

The Navy and Marine Corps issue parachutist insignia in two degrees: the U.S. military basic parachutist badge, also called the basic parachutist insignia (pictured below, as awarded to all DoD military services), and the Navy and Marine Corps parachutist insignia (pictured below). Parachutist insignia are available to personnel who perform jumps as a:

- Static-line parachute jumper
- Military free-fall parachute jumper
- High altitude/low opening (HALO) parachute jumper (used for premeditated personnel parachute operations)

The U.S Navy and Marine Corps Parachutist badge was originally known as the U.S. Navy Certified Parachute Rigger badge and designed by American Insignia Company in 1942 for graduates of the U.S. Navy Parachute Rigger School. During WWII, despite being against uniform regulations it became common for U.S. Marine Corps paratroopers who were issued the silver U.S. Army Basic Parachutist badge to wear the gold Navy Certified Parachute Rigger badge because they believed the gold "Rigger wings" looked better on their uniform. This out of regulations wearing of the Parachute Rigger badge became so common that in July 1963 the Commander of United States Marine Corps Force Reconnaissance Bruce F. Meyers sent a request to Chief of Naval Operations Admiral George W. Anderson Jr. via Marine Corps Commandant General David M. Shoup requesting to officially make the Navy Parachute Rigger badge the parachutist badge for the Navy and Marine Corps. The request was approved by Admiral Anderson on July 12, 1963, per BuPers Notice 1020, and was one of his last duties performed as Anderson was forced to retire only 2 weeks later on August 1, 1963 due to a contentious relationship with Secretary of Defense Robert S. McNamara, which McNamara viewed as "mutinous". Since 1963, being a graduate of the U.S. Navy Parachute Rigger School is no longer a requirement to earn the badge. The badge is authorized for officers and enlisted personnel who were awarded the basic parachutist insignia and, under competent orders, have completed a minimum of five additional static-line or premeditated personnel parachute jumps, to include a combat equipment day jump, two combat equipment night jumps, and employ at least two different types of military aircraft.

Training is accomplished by successful completion of the prescribed course of instruction while attending one of:

- U.S. Army basic airborne course
- U.S. Army basic military free-fall parachutist course
- Other training certified by Chief of Naval Education and Training or approved by the Chief of Naval Operations

The parachutist insignia was described in Bupers Notice 1020 as: "A gold embroidered (Navy only) or gold-colored metal pin, same as that provided for Naval Aviator’s insignia, except that a gold-colored open parachute shall be centered on the wings vice the shield and foul anchor; width of the wings from tip to tip shall be 2 3/4"; width of the parachute 1/2" at the widest part; length of the parachute from top to bottom 13/16".

Per the notice, Marines are required to wear the metal pin on all uniforms while Sailors may wear the metal pin or an embroidered version of the insignia on uniforms that allow for embroidery, such as coveralls, flight suits, and other Navy working uniforms.

== Special operations parachute rigger ==
Special operations parachute riggers work in support roles for Navy SEALS, Naval Special Warfare and explosive ordnance disposal units throughout the world. They inspect, maintain, pack, and use specialized premeditated personnel static line and military free fall parachute systems. They use and maintain specialized aerial delivery and re-supply systems, and helicopter insertion and extraction systems unique to NSW and EOD units. They function as parachute jump and helicopter rope suspension techniques masters. They also perform paraloft management, administrative functions, ordnance handling functions, and quality assurance inspections.

Navy Enlisted Classification (NEC) Designation: NEC PR-7353 Special Operations Parachute Rigger

1. NEC awardable upon completion of Army courses 431 F3 PARA NAVY or 860 43E10.
2. NEC OJT (on the job training) awardable if personnel attached to a rigger unit of EOD for 1 year and observed by Army/Navy school graduate and qualified prior to 1 July 1990 (CNO WASH DC 110512Z Aug 90 refers).
3. Personnel other than PRs must hold NEC 53XX to be assigned this NEC.

== United States Navy Parachute Team (Leap Frogs) ==
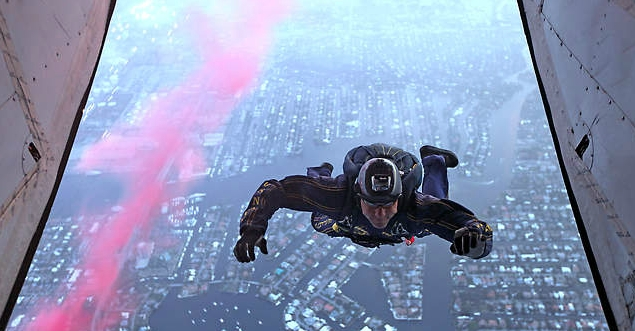
A Navy "leap frog" exits the aircraft

The United States Navy Parachute Team, commonly known as the "Leap Frogs", is the parachute demonstration team of the United States Navy. It consists of active-duty personnel drawn from parachute riggers, naval special warfare, including Navy SEALs, special warfare combatant-craft crewmen, and support personnel. The Leap Frogs are all volunteers. The team is sanctioned by the Department of Defense and recognized by the Federal Aviation Administration. The team was officially commissioned as the U.S. Navy Parachute Team in 1974 by the Chief of Naval Operations and assigned the mission of demonstrating Navy excellence throughout the United States.

Originally, there were two Navy Parachute Teams. The East coast team (NPT East) was called the "Chuting Stars" and the West coast team (NPT West) the "Leap Frogs". Because of budget constraints in the mid-1980s, the Chuting Stars were disbanded and the Leap Frogs assumed responsibility for all US Navy parachute demonstrations.

== PR Hall of Valor ==
- PRC Vincent R. Smit, Bronze Star (for combat operations), Oct. 5, 2004 – Apr. 22, 2005
- PRC Vincent R. Smit, Bronze Star 2nd Award (for combat operations), Apr. 8 – Oct. 21, 2006
- PR1 (AW/SW/FPJ) Andrew J. Lightner, Navy SEAL Team (killed in training, 2009)
- PR1 Gary Lee Blevins, Navy and Marine Corps Medal (for heroism), May 16, 1976
- PR1 Howell I. Bennett, Navy and Marine Corps Medal (for heroism), August 9, 1944
- PRAN Cody M. Larson, Navy and Marine Corps Medal (for heroism), June 19, 1993
- PRAA John A. Van Voorhis, Navy and Marine Corps Medal (for heroism), May 13, 1961
